= Anatoly =

Male given name

- Pronunciation: Ukrainian: [ɐnɐˈtɔl⁽ʲ⁾ij] Russian: [ɐnɐˈtolʲɪj]
- Gender: Male
- Language: Russian, Ukrainian

Origin
- Origin: Greek
- Meaning: Sunrise

Other names
- Variant forms: Anatoli, Anatolii, Anatoliy
- Derived: Anatolios
- Related names: Anatole; Anatol; Anatolio

Anatoly (Russian: Анато́лий, romanized: Anatoliy, Ukrainian: Анато́лій, romanized: Anatolii) is a common Russian and Ukrainian masculine given name, derived from the Greek name Anatolios (Ἀνατόλιος), meaning "he of the sunrise", from ἀνατολή anatolē, "sunrise".

Anatoly was one of the five most popular names for baby boys born in St. Petersburg, Russia, in 2004. Notable individuals with the name include:

== Chess ==
- Anatoly Bannik (1921–2013), Ukrainian chess player
- Anatoly Bykhovsky (born 1988), Russian-born Israeli chess grandmaster
- Anatoli Gantvarg (born 1948), Belarusian draughts grandmaster
- Anatoly Karpov (born 1951), Russian chess grandmaster (World Champion)
- Anatoly Lein (1963–2012), Soviet-American chess grandmaster
- Anatoly Lutikov (1933–1989), Soviet chess grandmaster
- Anatolijs Šmits (1941–1998), Latvian chess player
- Anatoly Ufimtsev (chess player) (1914–2000), Kazakh-Soviet chess player
- Anatoly Vaisser (born 1949), French chess grandmaster

== Writers ==
- Anatoly Agranovsky (1922–1984), Soviet journalist
- Anatoly Aleksin (1924–2017), Soviet writer
- Anatoliy Baranov (born 1959), Soviet journalist
- Anatoly Trofimovich Chernousov (1937–2000), Siberian Soviet writer
- Anatoliy Dimarov (1922–2014), Soviet writer
- Anatoly Faresov (1852–1928), Soviet publisher
- Anatoly Gladilin (1935–2018), Russian writer
- Anatoly Gunitsky (1953–2025), Russian writer
- Anatoli Ivanov (writer) (1928–1999), Soviet writer
- Anatoly Kasheida (1928–1998), Ukrainian writer
- Anatoli Kim (born 1939), Kazakh author
- Anatoly Kudryavitsky (born 1954), Russian-Irish writer
- Anatoly Kuznetsov (1929–1979), Soviet writer
- Anatoly Leman (1856–1913), Russian writer
- Anatoly Liberman (born 1937), American linguist
- Anatoly Lysenko (1937–2021), Russo-Soviet journalist
- Anatoly Marienhof (1897–1962), Russo-Soviet writer
- Anatoly Moskvin (born 1966), Russian former linguist, philologist, and historian
- Anatoly Naiman (1936–2022), Russo-Soviet writer
- Anatoly Serep (1920–2003), Chuvash writer
- Anatoly Shariy (born 1978), Ukrainian investigative journalist
- Anatoly Pavlovich Shikman (born 1948), Russian historian
- Anatoly Shteiger (1907–1944), Russian poet
- Anatoly Sofronov (1911–1990), Soviet writer
- Anatoliy Tomkiv (1954–2025), Ukrainian journalist
- Anatoly Vishevsky (born 1954), American scholar of Russian literature

== Physical arts ==
- Anatolii Bazylevych (1926–2005), Ukrainian illustrator
- Anatoly Belkin (born 1953), Russian artist
- Anatoly Danilov (born 1954), Soviet painter
- Anatoly Demidov, 1st Prince of San Donato, (1812–1870), Russian art collector
- Anatoly Dobrovolsky (1910-1988), Soviet architect
- Anatoliy Dymchuk (born 1965), Ukrainiana art collector
- Anatoli Egorov, Soviet photographer
- Anatoly Gunst (1858–1919), Russian architect
- Anatoly Ignashchenko (1930–2011), Ukrainian-Soviet architect
- Anatoly Kaigorodov (1878–1945), Russian painter
- Anatoli Lvovich Kaplan (1902–1980), Soviet-Jewish painter
- Anatoly Khrupov, Soviet photographer
- Anatoly Khvorostov (1940–2024), Soviet art historian
- Anatoly Konenko (born 1954), Russian artist
- Anatoliy Kryvolap (born 1946), Ukrainian painter
- Anatoly Kuznetsov (artist) (born 1947), Belarusian painter
- Anatoli Levitin (1922–2018), Soviet painter
- Anatoliy Nasedkin (1924–1994), Soviet painter
- Anatoli Nenartovich (1915–1988), Soviet painter
- Anatoly Osmolovsky (born 1969), Russian artist
- Anatoly Polyansky (1928–1993), Soviet architect
- Anatoly Rasskazov (1960–2010), Russian photographer and artist
- Anatoliy Shevchuk (1954–2011), Ukrainian art historian
- Anatoly Sivkov (1952–2017), Russian painter
- Anatolii Sloiko (born 1980), Ukrainian artist
- Anatoly Vasiliev (painter) (1940–2020), Russo-Soviet painter
- Anatoly Treskin (1905–1986), Soviet art restorer and artist
- Anatoli Vasiliev (1917–1994), Soviet realist painter
- Anatoly Lavrentievich Vysotsky (1924–1996), Soviet-Ukrainian artist
- Anatoly Yagudaev (1935–2014), Mountain Jewish sculptor
- Anatoly Zverev (1931–1906), Soviet abstract artist

== Television, film, and stage ==
- Anatoly Adoskin (1927–2019), Soviet actor
- Anatoliy Beliy (born 1972), Russian-Israeli actor
- Anatoly Efros (1925–1987), Soviet theater director
- Anatoly Eiramdzhan (1937–2014), Armenian filmmaker
- Anatoliy Falkovich (1923–1994), Azeri-Israeli actor
- Anatoly Fradis (born 1948), Soviet-born American film producer
- Anatoli Golovnya (1900–1982), Soviet cinematographer
- Anatoliy Havrylov (1932–2021), Ukrainian cinematographer
- Anatoly Iksanov (born 1952), Russian director and lead director of the Bolshoi Theater
- Anatoliy Kokush (born 1951) Krymchak film engineer
- Anatoliy Kotenyov (born 1958), Belarusian actor
- Anatoly Ktorov (1898–1980), Soviet actor
- Anatoly Kubatsky (1908–2001), Russo-Soviet actor
- Anatoly Kuznetsov (actor) (1930–2014), Soviet actor
- Anatoliy Lavrenishyn (born 1980), Ukrainian animator
- Anatoly Lobotsky (1959–2025), Soviet and Russian actor
- Anatoly Menshchikov (1950–2025), Russian actor
- Anatoly Mukasei (born 1938), Russo-Soviet cinematographer
- Anatoliy Palamarenko (born 1939), Ukrainian-Soviet actor and singer
- Anatoly Papanov (1922–1987), Soviet actor
- Anatoly Petrov (animator) (1937–2010), Russian animator
- Anatoly Ravikovich (1936–2012), Russo-Soviet actor
- Anatoli Romashin (1931–2000), Soviet actor
- Anatoly Shchukin (1916–1983), Soviet actor
- Anatoly Smiranin (1892–1971), Soviet actor
- Anatoly Solonitsyn (1934–1982), Russian actor
- Anatolii Solovianenko (born 1980), Ukrainian theater director
- Anatoly Vasiliev (theatre director) (born 1942), Russian theatre director
- Anatoly Vasilyev (actor) (born 1946), Russo-Soviet actor

== Music ==
- Anatoly Alexandrov (composer) (1888–1982), Russian composer
- Anatoliy Andreyev (1941–2004), Buryat composer
- Anatoly Avdievsky (1933–2016), Ukrainian conductor
- Anatoly Balchev (born 1946), Russian composer and actor
- Anatoly Bogatyrev (1913–2003), Soviet composer and music teacher
- Anatoliy Brandukov (1859–1930), Russian cellist
- Anatoly Dneprov (singer) (1947–2008), Russo-Ukrainian singer
- Anatoly Dokumentov (born 1937), Russian composer and pianist
- Anatoli Ivanov (musician) (1934–2012), Russian composer
- Anatoly Kocherga (born 1947), Ukrainian operatic bass
- Anatoliy Kos-Anatolsky (1909–1983), Soviet composer
- Anatoli Krastev (born 1947), Bulgarian cellist
- Anatoly Lepin (1907–1984), Soviet composer
- Anatoly Lyadov (1855–1914), Russian composer
- Anatoliy Mokrenko (1933–2020), Ukrainian operatic baritone
- Anatoly Novikov (1896–1984), Russo-Soviet composer
- Anatoly Sheludyakov (born 1955), Russian pianist
- Anatoliy Solovianenko (1932–1999), Soviet operatic tenor
- Anatoliy Yevdokymenko (1942–2002), Ukrainian musician
- Anatoly Zatin (born 1954), Russian composer

== Military ==
- Anatoliy Barhylevych (born 1969), Ukrainian military commander
- Anatoli Bashlakov (born 1975), Russian lieutenant-general
- Anatoly Betekhtin (1931–2012), Soviet general
- Anatoly Brandys (1923–1988), Soviet air force pilot
- Anatoly Nikolayevich Davidovich (1965–1992), Azeri soldier killed in battle
- Anatoly Dyakonov (1907–1972), Soviet lieutenant-general
- Anatoly Grebenyuk (born 1955), Russian military general
- Anatoly Gribkov (1919–2008), Soviet general
- Anatoli Kacharava (1910–1982), Georgian-Soviet sea captain
- Anatoly Kalinovsky (1865–1938), Russian army major general
- Anatoly Karelin (1922–1974), Soviet flying ace during the Korean War
- Anatoliy Kazmirchuk (born 1970), Ukrainian military doctor
- Anatoly Khrulyov (born 1955), Russian general
- Anatoly Konstantinov (1923–2006), Soviet flying ace
- Anatoly Kontsevoy (born 1968), Belarusian-born Russian army chief
- Anatoly Kornukov (1942–2014), Russian military general
- Anatoly Kosov (1927–1995), Soviet naval officer
- Anatoly Kostenko (born 1940), Belarusian lieutenant general
- Anatolii Kryvonozhko (born 1965), Ukrainian general
- Anatoly Kulikov (born 1946), Russian general
- Anatoly Kvashnin (1946–2022), Russian military officer
- Anatoly Kvochur (1952–2024), Russian test pilot
- Anatoly Kyarov (1957–2008), Russian militiaman accused of murder and torture assassinated by Islamists
- Anatoly Lappo (born 1963), Belarusian military officer
- Anatoly Lebed (1963–2012), Russian military officer
- Anatoly Nikolayevich Levchenko (1947–1985), Soviet pilot killed in duty
- Anatoly Lipinsky (born 1959), Russian admiral
- Anatoly Lyapidevsky (1908–1983), Soviet pilot
- Anatoly Morozov (pilot) (1916–1944), Soviet WWII flying ace
- Anatoly Motsny (1922–1960), Soviet senior lieutenant
- Anatoly Nedbaylo (1923–2011), Soviet military pilot
- Anatoly Nogovitsyn (1952–2019), Russian general
- Anatoly Petrakovsky (1901–1969), Soviet army major general
- Anatoly Pozdnyakov (1949–2001), Russian major general
- Anatoliy Pushnyakov (1954–2021), Ukrainian general
- Anatoly Rogozhin (1893–1972), Russian military officer
- Anatoly Romanov (born 1948), Russian colonel general
- Anatoly Sergeyev (1940–2025), Russian military officer
- Anatoly Serov (1910–1939), Soviet flying ace during the Spanish Civil War
- Anatoliy Shapiro (1913–2005), Soviet soldier who helped liberate Auschwitz
- Anatolii Shevchenko (born 1948), Cossack Hetman
- Anatoly Shkirko (born 1947), Soviet-Russian military leader
- Anatoly Sidorov (born 1958), Russian colonel general
- Anatoly Stessel (1848–1915), Russian military leader
- Anatoliy Syrotenko (born 1960), Ukrainian military commander
- Anatoly Zinevich (1932–2000), Soviet-Armenian lieutenant general
- Anatoly Zotov, Soviet naval attachee

== Criminals ==
- Anatoly Biryukov (1939–1979), Soviet serial killer who killed five babies
- Anatoly Kondratyev (born 1946), Russian-Ukrainian serial killer claiming to have killed 42 people
- Anatoly Maistruk (1948–1981), Soviet serial killer who killed between 8 and 28 people
- Anatoly Markov (born 1973), Russian serial killer
- Anatoly Nagiyev (1958–1981), Soviet serial killer and rapist
- Anatoli Neželski (born 1951), Estonian serial killer
- Anatoly Onoprienko (1959–2013), prolific Ukrainian serial killer and mass murderer
- Anatoly Sedykh (serial killer) (1963–2023), Russian serial killer who killed 12 people
- Anatoly Slivko (1938–1989), Soviet serial killer
- Anatoliy Tymofeev (1960–1996), Ukrainian serial killer who killed at least 13 people
- Anatoly Utkin (1943–1975), Soviet serial killer convicted of killing nine people

== S.T.E.M. ==
- Anatoly Agarkov (born 1949), Soviet spacecraft engineer
- Anatoly Ivanovich Akishin (born 1926), Soviet-Russian scientist
- Anatoly Alexandrov (physicist) (1903–1994), Soviet physicist
- Anatoly Alexandrov (engineer) (born 1951), Russian engineer
- Anatoli N. Andrianov (1936–2020), Russo-Soviet mathematician
- Anatoly Andriyashev (1910–2009), Soviet marine biologist
- Anatoly Artsebarsky (born 1956), Soviet cosmonaut
- Anatoly Babko (1905–1968), Soviet chemist
- Anatoly Basistov (1920–1998), Soviet electronic engineer
- Anatoly Belyaev (1906–1967), Soviet metallurgist
- Anatoly Berezovoy (1942–2014), Soviet cosmonaut
- Anatoli Blagonravov (1895–1975), Russian physicist
- Anatoli Bogdanov (zoologist) (1834–1896), Russian zoologist
- Anatoliy Boldyrev (1883–1946), Russian crystallographer
- Anatoliy Chizhov (1934–2021), Soviet aerospace engineer
- Anatoliy Daron (1926–2020), Soviet rocket engineer
- Anatoly Derevyanko (born 1943), Russo-Soviet archaeologist
- Anatoly Dneprov (writer) (1919–1975), Soviet cyberneticist
- Anatoly Dorodnitsyn (1910–1990), Soviet rocket scientist
- Anatoly Dyatlov (1931–1995), Russian nuclear engineer
- Anatoly Filipchenko (1928–2022), Soviet cosmonaut
- Anatoly Fomenko (born 1945), Russian mathematician
- Anatoly Frenkel (born 1964), Soviet-born American physicist
- Anatolii Goldberg (1930–2008), Soviet-Israeli mathematician
- Anatoly Grigoriev (1943–2023), Russo-Soviet psychologist
- Anatoli Ivanishin (born 1969), Russian cosmonaut
- Anatoli Kapustinskii (1906–1960), Soviet chemist
- Anatoly Karatsuba (1937–2008), Russian mathematician
- Anatoly Kartashov (cosmonaut) (1932–2005), Soviet cosmonaut
- Anatoly Kashpirovsky (born 1939), Russian psychotherapist and self-proclaimed hypnotist
- Anatoly Khazanov (born 1937), Soviet-American anthropologist
- Anatoly Kirpichnikov (1929–2020), Russo-Soviet archaeologist
- Anatoly Kitov (1920–2005), Soviet cybernetics pioneer
- Anatoly B. Kolomeisky (born 1967), Soviet-American academic
- Anatoly Kondratenko (born 1935), Ukrainian-Soviet professor of physics
- Anatoliy Koroteyev (born 1936), Russo-Soviet theoretical physicist
- Anatoly Kulomzin (1838–1923), Russian scientist and statesman
- Anatoly Kuzmin (politician, born 1903) (1903–1974), Soviet metallurgist
- Anatoly Kuzovnikov (1922–2004), Soviet-Russian physicist
- Anatoly Larkin (1932–2005), Soviet physicist
- Anatoly Levchenko (1941–1988), Soviet cosmonaut
- Anatoly Libgober (born 1949), Soviet-American mathematician
- Anatoly Logunov (1926–2015), Soviet physicist
- Anatoliy Lure (1901–1980), Soviet engineer
- Anatoly Makarenko (1936–2023), Russo-Soviet engineer and politician
- Anatoly Maltsev (1909–1967), Soviet mathematician
- Anatoly Maslov (born 1946), Russian physicist
- Anatoly Mikhaylov (radiologist) (1936–2026), Belarusian radiologist
- Anatoly Morozov (scientist) (born 1939), Ukrainian cyberneticist
- Anatoly Nikulin (1923–1996), Russian pharmacologist and apitherapist
- Anatoly Oleynik (1936–2019), Russian-Soviet professor of chemistry
- Anatoly Perminov (born 1945), Russian engineer
- Anatoly Pokrovsky (1930–2022), Russo-Soviet surgeon
- Anatoli Prudnikov (1927–1999), Soviet mathematician
- Anatoly Radyushkin (born 1951), Russian theoretical physicist
- Anatoly Riabinin (1874–1942), Russian palaentologist killed during the Siege of Leningrad
- Anatoly Rozhdestvensky (1920–1983), Soviet palaentologist
- Anatoli Rubinov (born 1939), Belarusian physicist
- Anatoly Rusanov (1932–2026), Russian chemist
- Anatoly Sagalevich (born 1938), Russian-Ukrainian scientist
- Anatoly Samoilenko (1938–2020), Russian mathematician
- Anatoly Savin (1920–2017), Soviet scientist
- Anatoly Shalyto (born 1948), Russian computer scientist
- Anatoly Sharpenak (1895–1969), Soviet biochemist
- Anatoly Shekhovtsov (1930–2012), Ukrainian-Soviet scientist
- Anatoly Shirshov (1921–1981), Soviet mathematician
- Anatoly Shvidenko (born 1937), Russo-Soviet ecologist
- Anatoly Skalny (born 1962), Russian biomedical physician
- Anatoliy Skorokhod (1930–2011), Soviet-American mathematician
- Anatoly Skurov (born 1952), Russian mining engineer
- Anatoly Smirnov (engineer) (1909–1986), Soviet structural mechanic
- Anatoly Smirnov (veterinarian) (born 1935), Russian scientist
- Anatolii Smorodintsev (1901–1986), Soviet virologist who contributed to the oral Polio vaccine
- Anatoly Solovyev (born 1948), Soviet cosmonaut
- Anatoli Strokatov (born 1955), Soviet table tennis player
- Anatoly Styopin (1940–2020), Russian mathematician
- Anatoly Sukhorukov (1935–2014), Russo-Soviet physicist
- Anatoly Ufimtsev (1880–1936), Russian aviation engineer
- Anatoly Vershik (1933–2024), Russian mathematician
- Anatoli Vitushkin (1935–2021), Russian mathematician
- Anatoly Vlasov (1908–1975), Soviet physicist
- Anatoly Yakobson (archaeologist) (1906–1984), Soviet archaeologist
- Anatoly Yakovenko (born 1979/80), Ukrainian-American programmer
- Anatoly Yakovlevich Taranetz (1910–1941), Soviet ichthyologist and WWII veteran
- Anatoliy Zahorodniy (born 1952), Ukrainian physicist
- Anatoly Zayats, Soviet-born British experimental physicist
- Anatoly Zhigljavsky (born 1953), British professor physicist
- Anatoly Zimon (1924–2015), Russian professor
- Anatoly Zolotukhin (1946–2022), Russian professor and petroleum engineer
- Anatoly Zubkov (1900–1967), Soviet physiologist
- Anatolii I. Zvyagin (1937–1991), Soviet physicist specializing in magnetic frequency

== Politicians ==
- Anatoly Adamishin (1934–2025), Russian diplomat
- Anatoly Akeyev (1954–2025), Soviet politician
- Anatoly Aksakov (born 1957), Russian politician
- Anatoly Antonov (born 1955), Russian diplomat
- Anatoly Artamonov (born 1952), Russian politician
- Anatoliy Baranovsky (1906–1988), Soviet politician
- Anatoly Bibilov (born 1970), President of South Ossetia
- Anatoly Bifov (born 1963), Russian politician
- Anatoliy Blashku (1944–2021), Transnistrian politician
- Anatoly Blatov (1914–1988), Soviet diplomat and bureaucrat
- Anatoliy Blyznyuk (born 1948), Ukrainian politician
- Anatoly Bolshakov (1930–2023), Soviet politician
- Anatoly Brovko (born 1966), Russian politician
- Anatoliy Burdiuhov (born 1958), Ukrainian politician and banker
- Anatoliy Butenko (1938–2021), Ukrainian politician
- Anatoly Bykov (born 1960), Russian politician and businessman
- Anatoly Chernyaev (1921–2017), Soviet politician and historian
- Anatoly Chubais (born 1955), Russian politician
- Anatoliy Danylenko (1953–2021), Ukrainian politician
- Anatoly Dernovoi (born 1951), Kazakh politician
- Anatoly Dobryakov (1939–2003), Russian politician
- Anatoly Dobrynin (1919–2010), Russian politician
- Anatoly Dolmatov (1951–2026), Russian politician
- Anatolii Draholiuntsev (1938–2023), Ukrainian politician
- Anatoliy Dron (born 1945), Ukrainian diplomat
- Anatoly Dryukov (1936–2023), Russo-Soviet diplomat
- Anatoliy Fedorchuk (1959–2020), Ukrainian politician
- Anatoliy Fedoruk (born 1972), Ukrainian politician
- Anatoliy Franchuk (1935–2021), Ukrainian politician
- Anatolii Frantsuz (1954–2025), Ukrainian politician
- Anatoly Frolov (1930–2025), Russian politician
- Anatoly Glaz (born 1982), Belarusian diplomat
- Anatoly Glushenkov (1942–2018), Russian politician and governor of Smolensk Oblast
- Anatolijs Gorbunovs (born 1942), Latvian politician
- Anatoly Greshnevikov (born 1956), Russian politician
- Anatoly Gromyko (1932–2017), Russo-Soviet diplomat
- Anatoliy Guretskiy (born 1955), Transnistrian politician
- Anatoly Gurinovich (1924–1999), Soviet diplomat
- Anatoly Guzhvin (1946–2004), Russian politician and governor of Astrakhan Oblast
- Anatoliy Holubchenko (born 1950), Ukrainian politician
- Anatoliy Hrytsenko (born 1957), Ukrainian politician
- Anatoliy Hrytsenko (politician, born 1958), Ukrainian politician
- Anatoly Isachenko (born 1966), Belarusian politician
- Anatoly Ivanov (politician, born 1950), Russian politician
- Anatoly Ivanov (politician, born 1960), Russian politician
- Anatoliy Kaminski (born 1950), Transnistrian politician
- Anatoliy Kasyanenko (1942–2001), Soviet diplomat
- Anatoliy Kinakh (born 1954), Ukrainian politician
- Anatoly Koni (1844–1927), Russian jurist
- Anatoliy Korniychuk (born 1957), Ukrainian politician
- Anatoliy Kukoba (1948–2011), Ukrainian politician
- Anatolii Kurtiev (born 1975), Ukrainian politician
- Anatolii Kutsevol (born 1985), Ukrainian diplomat
- Anatoly Kuzmin (politician, born 1859), Russian politician
- Anatoly Lavrentiev (1904–1984), Soviet diplomat
- Anatoly Lebedko (born 1961), Belarusian opposition politician
- Anatoly Lesun (born 1959), Russian politician
- Anatoly Lisitsyn (born 1947), Russian politician
- Anatoly Lokot (born 1959), Russian politician
- Anatoly Lukyanov (1930–2019), Russian politician
- Anatolijs Mackevičs (born 1956), Latvian politician
- Anatoliy Maksyuta (born 1963), Ukrainian bureaucrat
- Anatoly Malofeyev (1933–2022), Belarusian-Soviet politician
- Anatoly Markevich (born 1971), Belarusian politician
- Anatoliy Matviyenko (1953–2020), Ukrainian politician
- Anatoly Mishnev (born 1957), Russian politician
- Anatoly Mkrtchyan (1931–2022), Armenian politician
- Anatolii Mohyliov (born 1955), Ukrainian politician
- Anatolii Mokrousov (1943–2021), Ukrainian politician
- Anatoly Mossakovsky, 20th-century Russian politician
- Anatoly Neratov (1863–1938), Russian diplomat
- Anatoliy Ostapenko (born 1968), Ukrainian lawyer and politician
- Anatoly Pakhomov (born 1960), Russian politician and mayor of Sochi
- Anatolii Pliushko (born 1938), Ukrainian diplomat
- Anatoly Popov (born 1960), Russian politician
- Anatolii Prysiazhniuk (born 1953), Ukrainian politician
- Anatoly Romanchuk (1944–2023), Soviet-Ukrainian politician
- Anatoliy Romanenko (1928–2025), Ukrainian politician
- Anatoly Serdyukov (born 1962), Russian politician
- Anatoly Seryshev (born 1965), Russian politician
- Anatoly Shevtsov (1933–2025), Russian politician
- Anatoly Shirokov (born 1967), Russian politician
- Anatoly Sivak (born 1962), Belarusian politician
- Anatoly Sliva (born 1940), Belarusian-born Russian jurist
- Anatoly Sobchak (1937–2000), Russian politician
- Anatoly Torkunov (born 1950), Russian diplomat and scholar
- Anatoliy Turusin (1939–2022), Russian politician
- Anatoly Tyazhlov (1942–2008), Russian politician
- Anatoliy Urbanskyi (born 1975), Ukrainian politician
- Anatoliy Vitiv (born 1960), Ukrainian politician
- Anatoly Voronovsky (born 1966), Russian politician
- Anatoly Vyborny (born 1965), Russian politician
- Anatoly Wasserman (born 1952), Russian politician
- Anatoliy Yahoferov (born 1948), Ukrainian politician
- Anatoli Yatskov (1913–1993), Soviet diplomat
- Anatoly Yefremov (1952–2009), Russian politician
- Anatoly Yermolin (born 1960), Russian politician
- Anatoliy Zasukha (born 1958), Ukrainian politician
- Anatoly Zaytsev (politician) (1940–2022), Russian politician
- Anatoliy Zlenko (1938–2021), Ukrainian diplomat

=== Dissidents ===
- Anatoly Gekker (1888–1937), Soviet commander and victim of the Great Purge
- Anatoliy Golitsyn (1926–2008), KGB agent and Soviet defector to America
- Anatoli Granovsky (1922–1974), Soviet NKVD agent and defector to Germany
- Anatoly Koryagin (born 1938), Soviet psychiatrist and political dissident
- Anatoly Lamanov (died 1921), Russian leader of the Kronstadt rebellion
- Anatoly Levin-Utkin (died 1998), Russian journalist and murder victim
- Anatoly Lunacharsky (1875–1933), Soviet revolutionary
- Anatoly Marchenko (1938–1986), Soviet political prisoner
- Anatoly Pepelyayev (1891–1938), Russian general and Great Purge victim
- Anatoly Pristavkin (1931–2008), Russian writer and anti-Soviet activist
- Anatoly Rybakov (1991–1998), Soviet anti-Stalinist writer
- Anatoly Vaneyev (1872–1899), Russian revolutionary
- Anatoly Voronin (1951–2006), Russian journalist and murder victim
- Anatoly Yakobson (1935–1978), Soviet-Israeli anti-Communist dissident
- Anatoli Zhelezniakov (1895–1919), Russian anarchist assassinated by Anton Denikin

=== Intelligence ===
- Anatoly Belov (1927–1998), Soviet atheist propagandist
- Anatoly Chepiga (born 1979), Russian intelligence officer
- Anatoly Gorsky (1907–1980), KGB spy
- Anatoly Gurevich (1913–2009), Soviet spy
- Anatoly Trofimov (1940–2005), Soviet KGB officer

== Sportspeople ==
- Anatoly, persona name of Vladimir Shmondenko (born 1999), Ukrainian weightlifter
- Anatoly Akentyev (1942–2023), Soviet cross-country skier
- Anatoly Akimov (water polo) (1947–2002), Soviet water polo player
- Anatoly Albul (1936–2013), Soviet wrestler
- Anatoly Alexandrov (boxer) (born 1967), Russian boxer
- Anatoly Alyabyev (1951–2022), Soviet biathlete
- Anatoly Amelin (born 1946), Soviet table tennis player
- Anatoly Antonov (rower) (born 1934), Russian rower
- Anatoly Asrabayev (born 1968), Uzbek sport shooter
- Anatoly Avdeyev (born 1960), Soviet pentathlete
- Anatoly Badrankov (1941–1998), Kazakh long-distance runner
- Anatoli Badretdinov (born 1984), Russian futsal player
- Anatolijus Baranovas (born 1940), Soviet long-distance runner
- Anatoly Beloglazov (born 1956), Russian wrestler
- Anatoli Belyayev (1952–2025), Belarusian ice hockey player and coach
- Anatoly Bobkov (born 1967), Russian luger
- Anatoli Bogdanov (sport shooter) (1931–2001), Soviet sport shooter
- Anatoli Boisa (born 1983), Georgian basketball player
- Anatoliy Bondarchuk (1940–2025), Soviet hammer thrower
- Anatoly Bondarenko (born 1949), Russian ice speedway rider
- Anatoli Boukreev (1958–1997), Russian climber
- Anatolii Budiak (born 1995), Ukrainian cyclist
- Anatolii Budiak (borrn 1995), Ukrainian cyclist
- Anatoli Bulakov (1930–1994), Soviet boxer
- Anatolii Buruian (born 19910, Ukrainian wrestler
- Anatoli Buyalski (born 1959), Belarusian baseball coach
- Anatoly Bykov (wrestler) (born 1953), Soviet wrestler
- Anatoly Cherepovich (1936–1970), Soviet cyclist
- Anatoly Chukanov (1954–2021), Soviet cyclist
- Anatoly Demitkov (1926–2005), Soviet canoeist
- Anatoliy Dimov (born 1956), Soviet runner
- Anatoly Donika (born 1960), Russian ice hockey player
- Anatoliy Dovhal (born 1976), Ukrainian sprinter
- Anatoli Droga (born 1969), Ukrainian judoka
- Anatoly Emelin (born 1964), Russian ice hockey player and coach
- Anatoli Evdokimov (1945–2016), Russian pair skater
- Anatoli Fedorov (1936–2012), Soviet rower and coach
- Anatoli Fedotov (born 1966), Soviet ice hockey player
- Anatoli Fedyukin (1952–2020), Russian handball player
- Anatoly Fetisov (born 1940), Russian rower
- Anatoli Filatov (born 1975), Kazakh ice hockey player
- Anatoly Filippov (born 1963), Russian boxer
- Anatoli Firsov (1941–2000), Russian ice hockey player
- Anatoly Gladyshev (1947–1985), Soviet speed racer
- Anatolii Golyshev (born 1995), Russian ice hockey player
- Anatoliy Gorshkov (born 1958), Ukrainian race walker
- Anatoli Grishin (canoeist) (1939–2016), Soviet canoeist
- Anatoliy Herey (born 1989), Ukrainian fencer
- Anatoli Ionov (1939–2019), Soviet ice hockey player and coach
- Anatoly Ivanov (rower) (born 1950), Russian rower
- Anatoly Kamnev (1948–1992), Russian boxer
- Anatoly Kartashov (water polo) (1937–2005), Soviet water polo player
- Anatoli Kartayev (born 1947), Soviet ice hockey player and Russian ice hockey coach
- Anatoly Kashirov (born 1987), Russian basketball player
- Anatoly Kavkaev (1949–2021), Soviet wrestler
- Anatoly Kharlampiyev (1906–1979), Russian martial artist
- Anatoly Khokhlov (1947–2008), Soviet boxer
- Anatoli Khorozov (1925–2011), Ukrainian ice hockey administrator
- Anatoly Khrapaty (1962–2008), Soviet weightlifter
- Anatoly Kirov (born 1936), Soviet wrestler
- Anatoly Klebanov (1952–2011), Soviet water polo player
- Anatoliy Klimanov (1949–2009), Soviet boxer
- Anatoli Klimenko (born 1963), Kazakh-born Belarusian sport shooter
- Anatoliy Kobrisev (born 1950), Soviet canoer
- Anatoliy Kolesnikov (born 1988), Australian-Kazakh basketballer
- Anatoly Kolesov (1938–2012), Soviet wrestler
- Anatoly Kolesov (cyclist) (born 1931), Soviet cyclist
- Anatoli Koltuniewicz (born 1948), Australian basketballer
- Anatoly Konev (1921–1965), Soviet basketball player
- Anatoly Kononenko (1935–2010), Soviet sprint canoer
- Anatoly Korbut (born 1973), Soviet rower
- Anatoliy Korolkov, Soviet sprint canoer
- Anatoly Koteshev (born 1944), Soviet fencer
- Anatolii Kovalevskyi (born 1990), Ukrainian biathlete
- Anatolij Kovtun (1960–2005), Ukrainian basketball player
- Anatoly Kozlov (born 1955), Soviet weightlifter
- Anatoli Krikun (born 1948), Estonian basketball player
- Anatoly Kuzmin (speedway rider) (1950–1978), Soviet speedway racer
- Anatoly Lagetko (1936–2006), Soviet boxer
- Anatoly Laryukov (born 1970), Russian-born Belarusian judoka
- Anatoly Lepyoshkin (born 1938), Soviet speed skater
- Anatoly Lomachenko (born 1964), Ukrainian boxing trainer
- Anatoliy Luzgin (born 1931), Soviet rower
- Anatoly Makagonov (1932–2023), Soviet volleyball player
- Anatoly Makarevich (born 1970), Belarusian runner
- Anatoly Malykhin (born 1988), Russian MMA fighter
- Anatoly Martinov, Soviet canoer
- Anatoly Mashkov (born 1944), Soviet speed skater
- Anatoly Medennikov (born 1958), Soviet speed skater
- Anatoli Melikhov (1943–2024), Kazakh ice hockey coach
- Anatoly Mikhaylin (born 1958), Soviet sailor
- Anatoly Mikhaylov (hurdler) (1936–2022), Soviet hurdler
- Anatoly Moiseev (born 1989), Russian kickboxer
- Anatoliy Moroz (born 1948), Soviet high jumper
- Anatoliy Moshiashvili (1950–2018), Georgian-Soviet hurdler
- Anatoliy Mushyk (born 1981), Ukrainian weightlifter
- Anatoly Myshkin (born 1954), Soviet basketball player and coach
- Anatoly Nazarenko (born 1948), Kazakh wrestler
- Anatoly Nemtyryov (born 1946), Soviet rower
- Anatoli Nikontsev (born 1990), Russian ice hockey player
- Anatoliy Novikov (1947–2022), Ukrainian-Soviet judoka
- Anatoly Olizarenko (1936–1984), Soviet cyclist
- Anatoly Onishchuk (born 1946), Soviet sport shooter
- Anatoliy Pakhtusov (born 1985), Ukrainian cyclist
- Anatoly Parfyonov (1925–1993), Soviet wrestler
- Anatoly Perov (1926–2001), Soviet boxer
- Anatoly Petrov (athlete) (1929–2014), Soviet pole vaulter
- Anatoly Pisarenko (born 1958), Soviet weightlifter
- Anatoliy Piskulin (born 1952), Soviet triple jumper
- Anatoliy Polishchuk (1950–2016), Soviet volleyball player
- Anatoli Polivoda (1947–2024), Soviet basketball player
- Anatoly Polyakov (born 1980), Russian swimmer
- Anatoly Raznochintsev (1927–1994), Soviet swimmer
- Anatoli Reneiski (born 1968), Belarusian canoer
- Anatoliy Reshetnyak (born 1955), Soviet runner
- Anatoly Roshchin (1932–2016), Soviet wrestler
- Anatoliy Ryapolov (born 1997), Russian long jumper
- Anatoly Rybakov (swimmer) (born 1956), Soviet swimmer
- Anatoliy Samotsvetov (1932–2014), Soviet hammer thrower
- Anatoliy Sass (1935–2023), Soviet rower
- Anatoliy Sedasov (born 1939), Soviet sprint canoer
- Anatoli Semenov (born 1962), Russian ice hockey player
- Anatoly Sharykin (born 1954), Soviet canoer
- Anatoly Shchuplyakov (born 1938), Belgian hammer thrower
- Anatoly Shelyukhin (1930–1995), Soviet skier
- Anatoly Shevchenko (1940–2002), Russian handball player
- Anatoly Skavronsky (born 1940), Soviet swimmer
- Anatoli Šmigun (born 1952), Estonian skier
- Anatoly Smirnov (swimmer) (born 1958), Russian swimmer
- Anatoliy Solodun (born 1962), Ukrainian water polo player
- Anatoliy Solomin (born 1952), Soviet race walker
- Anatoly Starkov (born 1946), Soviet cyclist
- Anatoli Starostin (born 1960), Soviet pentathlete
- Anatoly Stepanenko (born 1949), Soviet cyclist
- Anatoli Stepanishev (born 1960), Russo-Ukrainian ice hockey player
- Anatoly Sukharkov (born 1938), Soviet long-distance runner
- Anatoly Sysoyev (born 1937), Soviet diver
- Anatoly Tankov (born 1941), Soviet equestrian
- Anatoly Tarabrin (1935–2008), Soviet rower
- Anatoli Tarasov (1918–1995), Russian ice hockey player and coach
- Anatoly Timofeyev (born 1985), Russian fencer
- Anatoly Timoshenko (born 1956), Soviet equestrian
- Anatoly Tishchenko (born 1970), Russian canoer
- Anatoly Tishchenko Sr. (born 1943), Russian canoer
- Anatoly Tkachuk (1937–2017), Soviet rower
- Anatoly Tokov (born 1990), Russian MMA fighter
- Anatoliy Trozhenkov (1930–1999), Soviet canoer
- Anatoly Tyurin (born 1968), Uzbek sprint canoer
- Anatoly Vedyakov (1930–2009), Soviet race walker
- Anatoli Volkov (born 1948), Soviet tennis player
- Anatoliy Volkov (born 1961), Soviet canoer
- Anatoly Volkov (born 1952), Soviet boxer
- Anatoly Yarkin (born 1958), Soviet cyclist
- Anatoliy Yarosh (born 1952), Soviet shot putter
- Anatoliy Yartsev (born 1993), Russian badminton player
- Anatoly Yegorov (1922–?), Soviet water polo player
- Anatoly Yevtushenko (1934–2026), Soviet handball player and Russian handball coach
- Anatoliy Yulin (1929–2002), Soviet hurdler
- Anatoly Zaytsev (skier) (born 1947), Soviet skier
- Anatoliy Zheglanov (1946–1999), Soviet ski jumper
- Anatoly Zhuravlev (born 1958), Russian swimming coach
- Anatoly Zourpenko (1975–2022), Russian basketball player

== Association football ==
- Anatoliy Abdula (born 1976), Ukrainian football referee
- Anatoli Agrofenin (born 1980), Russian footballer
- Anatoly Akimov (footballer) (1915–1984), Soviet footballer
- Anatoli Anisimov (born 1998), Russian footballer
- Anatoli Aslamov (born 1953), Russian football coach
- Anatoliy Azarenkov (born 1938), Ukrainian football coach and Soviet footballer
- Anatoly Baidachny (born 1952), Russian football manager
- Anatoli Balaluyev (born 1976), Russian footballer
- Anatoliy Banishevskiy (1946–1997), Azeri footballer largely considered to be the greatest in his country's history
- Anatoli Bashashkin (1924–2002), Russian footballer
- Anatoliy Bezsmertnyi (born 1969), Ukrainian footballer
- Anatoli Bogdanov (footballer) (born 1981), Russian footballer
- Anatoly Bogdanov (footballer) (born 1981), Russo-Kazakh footballer
- Anatoly Bogovik (born 1947), Soviet footballer
- Anatoly Budayev (1969–2013), Belarusian footballer
- Anatoly Budayev (1969–2013), Belarusian footballer
- Anatoly Bulgakov (footballer, born 1944), Russian footballer and coach
- Anatoly Bulgakov (footballer, born 1979), Russian footballer
- Anatoliy Burlin (born 1990), Ukrainian footballer
- Anatoliy Buznyk (born 1961), Ukrainian footballer
- Anatoliy Byshovets (born 1946), Soviet footballer and olympic gold medalist
- Anatoliy Chantsev (born 1958), Ukrainian footballer coach and player
- Anatoli Chekanov (born 1960), Russian footballer
- Anatoly Chertkov (1936–2014), Russian footballer
- Anatoliy Chystov (born 1962), Ukrainian footballer
- Anatoli Davydov (born 1953), Russian football coach
- Anatoliy Demyanenko (born 1959), Russian football coach and player
- Anatoliy Didenko (born 1982), Ukrainian footballer
- Anatoliy Doroshenko (born 1953), Soviet footballer
- Anatoli Gerk (born 1984), Russian football midfielder
- Anatoli Gospodinov (born 1994), Belarusian footballer
- Anatoli Aleksandrovich Grishin (born 1986), Russian footballer
- Anatoliy Grytsayuk (born 1969), Ukrainian footballer
- Anatoli Ilyin (1931–2016), Soviet footballer
- Anatoli Isayev (1932–2016), Soviet football player and coach
- Anatoli Ivanov (footballer, born 1940), Russian footballer and coach
- Anatoli Ivanov (footballer, born 1972), Russian footballer
- Anatoli Izmailov (1978–2011), Russian footballer
- Anatoli Kanishchev (born 1971), Russian footballer
- Anatoli Katrich (born 1994), Russian footballer
- Anatoli Kertoake (born 1964), Russian footballer
- Anatoly Kikin (1940–2012), Soviet football player and manager
- Anatoli Kirilov (1966–2009), Bulgarian football player and manager
- Anatoli Kisurin (1969–2014), Russian footballer
- Anatoliy Kitsuta (born 1985), Ukrainian footballer
- Anatoliy Kokhanovskyi (born 1995), Ukrainian footballer
- Anatoli Kondratenko (born 1959), Soviet footballer
- Anatoliy Konkov (1949–2024), Soviet footballer
- Anatoliy Korobochka (born 1955), Soviet footballer and Ukrainian football coach
- Anatoli Kozhemyakin (1953–1974), Soviet footballer
- Anatoliy Kretov (born 1976), Ukrainian footballer
- Anatoliy Kroshchenko (born 1937), Soviet football player and coach
- Anatoly Krutikov (1933–2019), Soviet footballer and Russian football manager
- Anatoliy Kuksov (1949–2022), Soviet footballer
- Anatoliy Kutsev (1959–2016), Soviet footballer and Ukrainian football manager
- Anatoliy Lebid (born 1944), Soviet football player and coach
- Anatoli Leshchenkov (born 1946), Soviet footballer and Russian football coach
- Anatoli Lukianchikov (born 1975), Moldovan footballer
- Anatoli Lyz (born 1943), Russian football coach
- Anatoli Malkov (born 1981), Russian footballer
- Anatoliy Masalov (born 1990), Ukrainian footballer
- Anatoli Maslyonkin (1930–1988), Soviet footballer
- Anatoliy Matkevych (born 1977), Ukrainian footballer
- Anatoliy Matyukhin (born 1930), Soviet footballer
- Anatoli Mironov (born 1977), Russian football player and coach
- Anatoliy Molotay (footballer) (1937–2022), Soviet football player and Ukrainian football coach
- Anatolii Momot (born 1958), Ukrainian football manager
- Anatoly Morozov (footballer) (born 1973), Russian football player and coach
- Anatoliy Mushchynka (born 1970), Ukrainian-born German footballer
- Anatoli Nankov (born 1969), Bulgarian footballer and a coach
- Anatoli Nemchenko (born 2000), Russian footballer
- Anatoli Nezhelev (born 1985), Turkmen-Russian footballer
- Anatoliy Nuriyev (born 19960, Azeri footballer
- Anatoliy Oprya (born 1977), Ukrainian footballer
- Anatoli Parov (1956–2013), Soviet footballer
- Anatoli Pata (1958–2025), Russian footballer
- Anatoliy Piskovets (born 1948), Soviet football player and Ukrainian football coach
- Anatoli Piskunov (born 1949), Soviet footballer
- Anatoli Polosin (1935–1997), Russian football coach
- Anatoli Ponomarev born 1982), Azeri footballer
- Anatoli Porkhunov (1928–1992), Soviet footballer
- Anatoliy Povedenok (born 1969), Kazakh footballer
- Anatoli Pulyayev (born 1988), Russian footballer
- Anatoly Puzach (1941–2006), Soviet-Ukrainian former footballer and coach
- Anatoliy Radenko (born 1959), Soviet footballer
- Anatoliy Romanchenko (born 2001), Ukrainian footballer
- Anatoli Romanovich (born 1979), Russian footballer
- Anatoli Rozhkov (born 1972), Russian football coach and player
- Anatolii Sadovskyi (1916–1981), Soviet football coach
- Anatoliy Sanin (born 1990), Ukrainian footballer
- Anatoliy Saulevych (1959–2021), Ukrainian footballer
- Anatoly Savinsky (born 1986), Belarusian footballer
- Anatoli Sedykh (born 1970), Russian footballer
- Anatoly Seglin (1922–2009), Soviet footballer and ice hockey player
- Anatoliy Seryohin (born 1972), Ukrainian footballer
- Anatoliy Shakun (1948–2020), Soviet football player and coach
- Anatoli Shelest (born 1955), Russo-Ukrainian football player and coach
- Anatoliy Shepel (born 1949), Ukrainian football player
- Anatoliy Shulzhenko (1945–1997), Soviet footballer
- Anatoli Sigachyov (born 1974), Russian footballer
- Anatoli Skvortsov (born 1976), Russo-Ukrainian footballer
- Anatoliy Starushchenko (born 1988), Ukrainian footballer
- Anatoli Stukalov (born 1991), Russo-Kazakh footballer
- Anatolis Sundas (born 1994), Romanian footballer
- Anatoli Sylka (1978–2009), Russian footballer
- Anatoli Tebloyev (born 1974), Russian footballer
- Anatoly Tikhonchik (born 1976), Belarusian footballer
- Anatoli Todorov (born 1985), Bulgarian footballer
- Anatoli Tonov (born 1968), Bulgarian footballer
- Anatoliy Trubin (born 2001), Ukrainian footballer
- Anatoliy Tymofeyev (born 1992), Ukrainian footballer
- Anatoliy Tymoschuk (born 1979), Ukrainian footballer
- Anatoliy Tynynyk (born 1984), Ukrainian footballer
- Anatoliy Ulyanov (born 1998), Ukrainian footballer
- Anatoli Ushanov (1950–2017), Russian football coach and player
- Anatoli Vanzhula (born 1975), Russian footballer
- Anatoliy Verteletsky (born 1975), Ukrainian football player and coach
- Anatoly Vlasichev (born 1988), Kyrgyz footballer
- Anatoly Volin (1903–2007), Chairman of the Soviet Supreme Court
- Anatoliy Volobuyev (born 1953), Soviet footballer
- Anatoli Volovodenko (born 1963), Tajik footballer
- Anatoli Yakushev (born 1980), Russian footballer
- Anatoliy Yurevich (born 1957), Belarusian football coach
- Anatoli Zarapin (born 1947), Ukrainian football player and coach
- Anatoli Zavyalov (born 1979), Russian footballer
- Anatoliy Zayayev (1931–2012), Soviet football player and Ukrainian football coach
- Anatoliy Zhabchenko (born 1979), Ukrainian footballer
- Anatoly Zhukov (born 1991), Belarusian footballer
- Anatoli Zinchenko (born 1949), Soviet footballer

== Miscellaneous ==
- Anatoly Bokschanin (1903–1979), Soviet antiquarian
- Anatolii Brezvin (born 1956), Ukrainian businessman, politician, and ice hockey executive
- Anatoli Bugorski (born 1942), Russian scientist
- Anatoly Pavlovich Demidov, 4th Prince of San Donato (1874–1943), Russian prince
- Anatoliy Drabovskyi (born 1958), Ukrainian educator and economist
- Anatoly Durov (1887–1928), Russian animal trainer
- Anatolii Horelik (1890–1956), Ukrainian activist
- Anatoly Ionov (Romanov claimant) (born 1936), Royal pretender
- Anatoliy Kabayda (1912–1998), Soviet community activist
- Anatoli Kamugisha (born 1963), Ugandan businessman
- Anatoly Komm (born 1967), Russian chef
- Anatoly Kovler (born 1948), Tajik-Russian legal scholar
- Anatoly Kucherena (born 1960), Russian lawyer
- Anatoli Ljutjuk (born 1947), Ukrainian-Estonian friar and artisan
- Anatoly Loktionov (born 1947), Russian businessman
- Anatolii Matios (born 1969), Ukrainian prosecutor
- Anatoliy Mazaraki (born 1950), Ukrainian economist
- Anatoly Novoseltsev (1933–1995), Soviet orientalist
- Anatoly Pokrytan (1920–2003), Soviet economist
- Anatoly Rosenshield (1860–1929), Russian general
- Anatoly Rubin (1927–2017), Israeli-Belarusian Holocaust and gulag survivor
- Anatoly Savenko (1874–1922), Russian activist
- Anatoly Shesteryuk (born 1952), Russian environmental lawyer
- Anatoliy Smirnov (1941–2022), Russian economist
- Anatoly Vishnevsky (1935–2021), Russian demographer
- Anatoly Yakunin (born 1964), Russian police officer
- Anatoly Yarovyi (born 1982), Ukrainian attorney

== Fictional ==
- Anatoli Knyazev (also known as KGBeast), a fictional character appearing in DC Comics
- Anatoli (Anatole) Kuragin, a character in Leo Tolstoy's War and Peace
- Anatoly Sergievsky, from the musical Chess
- Anatoly Novoseltsev, a main character in the 1977 Russian film 'Office Romance' and the later 2011 remake 'Office Romance. Our Time' where he was played by Volodymyr Zelenskyy, the now president of Ukraine.

== See also ==
- Anastasia
