= Zimon =

Zimon or Zimoń is a surname. Notable people with the surname include:

- Anatoly Zimon (1924–2015), Russian professor
- Damian Zimoń (born 1934), Polish archbishop
- Henryk Zimoń (1940–2022), Polish philologist

== See also ==
- Zima (surname)
