= Anatoli Grishin =

Anatoli Grishin may refer to:

- Anatoli Grishin (canoeist) (1939–2016), Soviet Russian canoeist
- Anatoli Grishin (footballer) (born 1986), Russian footballer
