= Meigan Charlotte Aronson =

American-Canadian physicist

- Education: University of Illinois Urbana-Champaign; Bryn Mawr College
- Scientific career
- Workplaces: University of British Columbia; Texas A&M University; Stony Brook University; Brookhaven National Laboratory; University of Michigan; Los Alamos National Laboratory
- Thesis: Effects of doping on the electronic properties of niobium triselenide (1988)

Meigan Charlotte Aronson is an American–Canadian physicist, professor and former dean of the Faculty of Science at the University of British Columbia. Her research looks to identify emerging phases (e.g., novel order) near a quantum phase transition.

== Early life and education ==
Aronson studied physics at Bryn Mawr College. She moved to the University of Illinois Urbana-Champaign for a PhD in physics. Her doctoral research considered the electronic properties of niobium triselenide. She was a postdoctoral researcher at Los Alamos National Laboratory, where she worked in condensed matter. She held a visiting position at the University of Amsterdam.

== Research and career ==
Aronson started her physics career at the University of Michigan as an assistant professor of physics. She was made professor in 2002, and associate dean in 2004. Aronson moved to Stony Brook University in 2007, where she was made professor. Alongside her position at Stony Brook, Aronson led the correlated electron materials section at Brookhaven National Laboratory. She joined Texas A&M University in 2015, where she spent three years before moving to the University of British Columbia.

Aronson studies the emerging physics of materials close to a quantum phase transition. She investigates how new physics emerges close to zero temperature.

From 2018-2024, Aronson was the dean of the Faculty of Science at University of British Columbia. She is chair of the external advisory committee of the National High Magnetic Field Laboratory and the American Physical Society Division of Condensed Matter Physics.

== Awards and honours ==
- 2001 Elected Fellow of the American Physical Society
- 2010 Department of Defense Security Fellow
- 2018 Elected Fellow of the Neutron Scattering Society of America

== Select publications ==
- Xiaowei Teng; Feygenson, Mikhail; Qi Wang; Jiaqing He; Wenxin Du; Anatoly I Frenkel; Weiqiang Han; Aronson, Meigan Charlotte (2009). "Electronic and magnetic properties of ultrathin Au/Pt nanowires". Nano Letters. 9 (9): 3177–3184. doi:10.1021/nl9013716. PMID 19645434. Wikidata Q62713350.
- Xiao-Liang Wang; Feygenson, Mikhail; Haiyan Chen; et al. (2011). "Nanospheres of a new intermetallic FeSn5 phase: synthesis, magnetic properties and anode performance in Li-ion batteries". Journal of the American Chemical Society. 133 (29): 11213–11219. doi:10.1021/ja202243j. PMID 21678973. Wikidata Q84376052.
