= Anatoly Bolshakov =

Soviet-Russian industrialist and politician (1930–2023)

Member of the Soviet of Nationalities
- In office 1979–1989
- Constituency: Moldavian SSR

Personal details
- Born: Anatoly Ivanovich Bolshakov; 9 August 1930 Moscow Oblast, Russian SFSR, USSR
- Died: 1 June 2023 (aged 92) Krasnogorsk, Moscow Oblast, Russia
- Party: CPSU
- Education: Tula State University
- Occupation: Industrialist

Anatoly Ivanovich Bolshakov (Russian: Анатолий Иванович Большаков; 9 August 1930 – 1 June 2023) was a Soviet-Russian industrialist and politician. A member of the Communist Party, he served in the Soviet of Nationalities from 1979 to 1989.

Bolshakov died in Krasnogorsk, Moscow Oblast on 1 June 2023, at the age of 92.
