= Anatoliy Shulzhenko =

Ukrainian and Soviet footballer

Personal information
- Full name: Anatoliy Oleksiyovych Shulzhenko
- Date of birth: 17 February 1945
- Place of birth: Voroshylovhrad, USSR
- Date of death: 8 July 1997 (aged 52)
- Place of death: Luhansk, Ukraine
- Position: Defender

Senior career*
Years	Team	Apps	(Gls)
1963–1973	Zorya Voroshilovgrad	238	(2)
1973	Tavriya Simferopol	4	(0)
1974	Zvezda Kirovograd	17	(0)

International career
1971	USSR	1	(0)
- * Club domestic league appearances and goals

Anatoliy Oleksiyovych (or Anatoli Alekseyevich) Shulzhenko (Russian: Анатолий Алексеевич Шульженко; 17 February 1945 – 8 July 1997) was a Ukrainian and Soviet football player.

== Honours ==
- Soviet Top League winner: 1972.

== International career ==
Shulzhenko played his only game for USSR on 28 April 1971 in a friendly against Bulgaria.
