= Anatoly Mossakovsky =

Anatoly Aleksandrovich Mossakovsky (Russian: Анатолий Александрович Моссаковский) was a Russian monarchist politician and public figure. He served as Deputy Chairman of the Kiev Club of Russian Nationalists. In July 1917, he was elected to the Kiev City Duma. Mossakovsky stood as a candidate in the 1917 Russian Constituent Assembly election on the 'Non-Party Bloc of Russian Voters of Kiev Governorate' (List 8) in the Kiev electoral district.
