= Anatoly Belyaev =

Soviet metallurgist (1906–1967)

Anatoly Ivanovich Belyaev (1906–1967) founded the school of metallurgy of light non-ferrous metals and semi-conducting materials. He was Professor of Moscow Institute of Steel and Alloys. He was head of the department of metallurgy of light metals in the Moscow Institute of Non-ferrous Metals and Gold from 1943 to 1963. From 1962 to 1967 he was organizer and head of the chair for producing pure metals and semi-conducting materials in MISIS.

== Basic studies ==
- Physico-chemical properties of fused electrolytes, in particular, chloride melts and their role in melting aluminum alloys
- Electrolytic aluminum and magnesium production,
- Theory of anode effect occurrence;
- Processes of electrolysis production of primary aluminum using lithium additives in the form of lithium fluoride
- Problems in the high-purity aluminum production,
- Elaboration of the method to remove impurities from aluminum by means of transport reactions through subhalogenides,
- Aluminum electric refining in the high-purity metal production, surface phenomena in fused salts,
- Production processes of particularly pure metals and semi-conducting materials,
- Metallurgy of aluminum, magnesium, beryllium, lithium, zirconium, etc.
- Designed fluxing material compositions are applied in production.

== Publications ==
- "Non-ferrous metals", 1957, No. 9. Chu Ianiang, Belayev A. I.
- "Proceedings of metallurgists. Non-ferrous metallurgy", 1959, No. 2.
- "Metallurgy of light metals. General course" (Higher school manual). Metallurgizdat, 1940, 1944, 1949, 1954, 1962 (6 publications)
- "Surface phenomena in metallurgical processes". Metallurgizdat, 1952.
- "Physico-chemical principles in purification of metals and semi-conducting materials". Publishing House of MISiS, 1965.
- "Physical chemistry of fused salts". Metallurgizdat, 1957.
- "Electrolytic aluminum production". Metallurgizdat, 1941.
- "Electrometallurgy of aluminum". Metallurgizdat, 1953.
- "Monovalent aluminum in metallurgical processes"
- "Pure aluminum production"
- "Metallurgy of pure metals and semi-conductors", together with L.A. Firsanova and E.A. Zhemchuzhina.
