= Anatoly Vishevsky =

American scholar of Russian

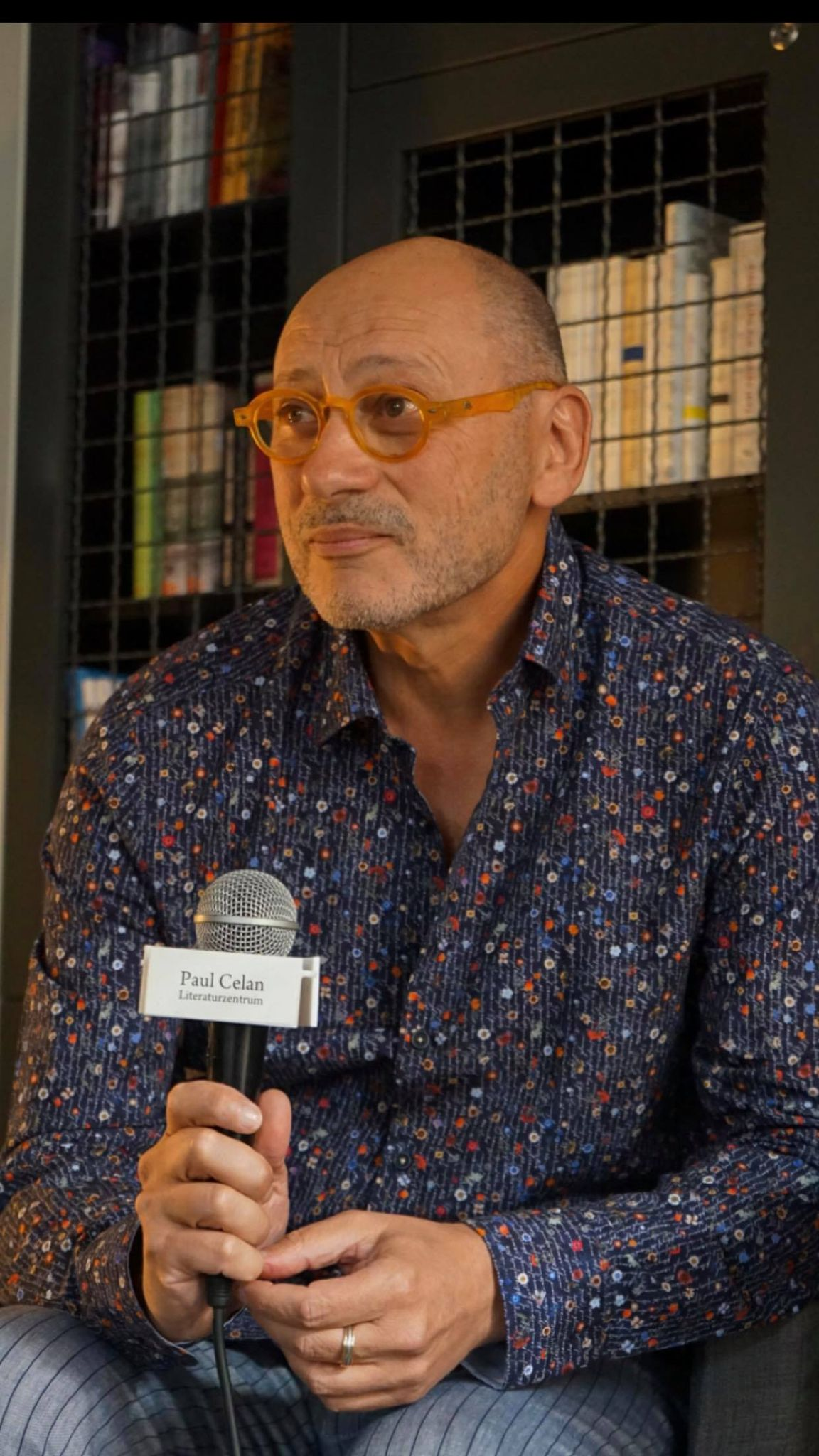
Anatoly Vishevsky at a literature festival in Chernivtsi

Anatoly Vishevsky (born June 21, 1954 Chernivtsi, Ukraine) is an American scholar of Russian literature, writer, and author of the novel Fragile Fantasies of Oberbossierer Loys.

== Biography ==
Anatoly Vishevsky was born in Chernivtsi in 1954. In 1976 he graduated from the English Department at Chernivtsi University and taught English. He immigrated to the United States in 1979 and started graduate school in the Slavic Department at the University of Kansas. Vishevsky defended his doctoral dissertation on Russian literature in 1985.

After receiving his doctorate, Vishevsky taught at Middlebury College and Washington University. Since 1994 he has been teaching in the Russian Department at Grinnell College in Iowa.

Vishevsky is the author of monographic research on irony in Soviet intellectual pop culture and the post-Soviet detective genre of the 1990s. He has also written articles on Russian literature and culture of the 19th and 20th centuries, and the history of early Meissen porcelain. His work has been published by academic journals in Austria, Britain, Hungary, the Netherlands, Canada, Poland, France and Russia (Literaturnaia gazeta, Kriticheskaia massa, Neprikosnovennyi zapas and others).

In the 1970s, Vishevsky and Boris Briker coauthored and published short stories of "ironic prose" genre in the Soviet Union in Literaturnaia gazeta, and the journals Iunost', Studencheskii meridian and Sovetskii ekran. After the two men left the Soviet Union, their work was published in the journal Kontinent, and in 1983 as a collection of prose entitled Dog's Affair (Sobach'e delo) with Tret'ia volna Press.

Vishevsky and Briker had been working on a book about the Yiddish language and people who no longer speak it. In 2018 in Ukraine Vishevsky published Fragile Fantasies of Oberbossierer Loys The second edition of the book was released in Russia by Popcorn Books in October 2020.

Vishevsky resides in Prague, Berlin and Grinnell.

== Books (in Russian) ==
- Fragile Fantasies of Oberbossierer Loys. Second Edition. Moscow: Popcorn Books, 2020.
- Fragile Fantasies of Oberbossierer Loys. Chernivtsi: Meridian Czernowitz, 2018.
- Chernovtsy Stories. B. Briker & A. Vishevsky, edited. Chernovtsy: Meridian Czernowitz, 2014.
- Dog's Affair (coauthored with B. Briker). Paris-New York: Tret'ia volna, 1983.

== Selected academic publications ==
- Through the Prism of the Detective Story. The World of the Novels of Boris Akunin and Leonid Iuzefovich. Moscow: RGGU, 2011. (In Russian)
- Soviet Literary Culture in the 1970s: The Politics of Irony (with an anthology of ironic prose translated by Michael Biggins and Anatoly Vishevsky). University Press of Florida, 1993. (In English)
- "The Meaning of the Dress: Erast Fandorin and the Wardrobe of Russian Literature." Kriticheskaia massa, No. 1, 2005. (In Russian)
- "Three Cards — Three Fates: Thoughts About the Book Not Written In Prague During A Sabbatical." Literaturnaia gazeta, No. 28 (July 11–17, 2001). (In Russian)
- "E. Zamiatin's 'Cave' and L. Leonov's 'The End of the Little Man': Parody As Political Controversy." Russian Literature XXXVII (1995). (In Russian)
- "Creating a Shattered World: Towards a Poetics of Yevgeny Popov." World Literature Today 67, no. 1 (Winter 1993). (In English)
- "Humor In the Popular Culture of the Soviet Intelligentsia of the 1960s and 1970s" (coauthored with B. Briker). Wiener Slawistischer Almanach 24 (Winter 1989). (In Russian)
- "Tradition in the Topsy-Turvy World of Parody: Analysis of Two Oberiu Plays." Slavic and Eastern European Journal 30, no. 3 (Fall 1986). (In English)
