= Anatoly Nikulin =

Russian pharmacologist and apitherapist (1923–1996)

Anatoly Alexandrovich Nikulin
- Born: August 21, 1923
- Died: October 14, 1996 (aged 73)
- Education: Saratov State Medical University
- Awards: Order of the October Revolution (1971); Order of the Badge of Honour (1966)
- Scientific career
- Fields: Pharmacology
- Workplaces: Ryazan State Medical University

Anatoly Alexandrovich Nikulin (Russian: Анатолий Александрович Никулин; August 21, 1923 in Saratov, Soviet Union – October 14, 1996 in Ryazan, Russia) was a Russian pharmacologist and a Doctor of Medical Sciences. From 1961 to 1983, he was Rector of the Ryazan State Medical University (RSMU). In 1967, he received the title of Professor.

Nikulin was a member of the Communist Party of the Soviet Union from 1945 onwards. He graduated with honors from the Saratov State Medical University in 1946. In 1949, he defended his Candidate's Dissertation. He started working at the RSMU in 1953. From 1959 to 1990, Nikulin headed the Department of Pharmacology. In 1966, he defended his doctoral dissertation. He worked in the field of apitherapy.

He was a member of the Editorial Board for «Фармакология и токсикология».

He was awarded:

- Order of the October Revolution (1971)
- Order of the Badge of Honour (1966)
- Medal "Veteran of Labour" (1986)
