= Anatoly Pokrytan =

Soviet economist (1920–2003)

Anatoly Karpovych Pokrytan (Ukrainian: Анатолій Карпович Покритан; 2 December 1920 – 27 September 2003) was a Soviet and Ukrainian economist. He founded the Odesa Scientific School of Economic Thought at Odesa National Economics University, where he worked for over fifty years and was head of the Department of Political Economy.

== Life ==
Pokrytan studied at graduate school at Kyiv State University in the early 1950s, during the debates following Stalin's 1951 Economic Problems of Socialism in the USSR. In the early 1960s he co-authored a monograph on property in the Soviet economic system with V. I. Kasatkina and V. N. Mazur. He also wrote several works on the theory of social reproduction.

== Works ==
- (with V. I. Kasatkina and V. N. Mazur) Sot︠s︡ialisticheskai︠a︡ sobstvennostʹ pri perekhode k kommunizmu [Socialist Ownership in the Transition to Communism]. Moscow: Mysl, 1964.
- Metodologicheskie problemy ėkonomicheskoĭ teorii sot︠s︡ializma [Methodological Problems in the Economic Theory of Socialism]. 1970.
- Proizvodstvennye otnoshenii︠a︡ i ĕkonomicheskie zakony sot︠s︡ializma [Production Relations and the Economic Laws of Socialism]. Moscow, 1971. Translated into German by Dieter Graf and Gerhard Krupp as Produktionsverhältnisse und ökonomische Gesetze des Sozialismus: eine methodische Studie zur Analyse und zur Theorie. Berlin: Akademie-Verlag, 1973.
- Socialistieskij produkt i ego formy [Social Product and its Forms]. 1975.
- Istoricheskoe i logicheskoe v ėkonomicheskoĭ teorii sot︠s︡ializma [History and Logic in the Economic Theory of Socialism]. Moscow, 1978. Translated into German by Rainer Sämisch as Das Historische und das Logische in der ökonomischen Theorie des Sozialismus. Berlin: Akademie-Verlag, 1981.
- Fond vozmeščenija l podrazdelenija i problema sbalansirovannosti. 1982.
- Ekonomicheskaia struktura sotsializma: funktsionirovanie i razvitie [The Economic Structure of Socialism: Functioning and Development]. 1985.
- Leninskie raboty 90-kh godov i sovremennostʹ [Lenin's work of the 90s and the Present]. 1985.
