= Anatoly Tankov =

Soviet equestrian

Personal information
- Nationality: Soviet
- Born: 5 September 1941 (age 83)

Sport
- Sport: Equestrian

Anatoly Tankov (born 5 September 1941) is a Soviet equestrian. He competed in two events at the 1988 Summer Olympics.
