= Anatolii Bazylevych =

Ukrainian book illustrator and graphic artist

- Анатолій Дмитрович Базилевич
- Born: Anatolii Dmytrovych Bazylevych; 7 June 1926; Zhmerynka, Vinnytsia Okruha, Ukrainian SSR, Soviet Union
- Died: 30 June 2005 (aged 79); Kyiv, Ukraine
- Resting place: Baikove Cemetery, Kyiv
- Occupations: Illustrator, graphic artist
- Years active: 1950s–2000s
- Notable work: Illustrations to Eneida by Ivan Kotliarevsky
- Awards: Merited Artist of the Ukrainian SSR (1969); People's Artist of Ukraine (1993); Medal "For Labour Distinction"

Anatolii Dmytrovych Bazylevych (7 June 1926 – 30 June 2005) was a Ukrainian artist and illustrator, recognised as a Merited Artist of the Ukrainian SSR in 1969 and as a People's Artist of Ukraine in 1993. He is best known for his book illustrations, particularly for Ivan Kotliarevsky's poem Eneida (Aeneid), which have become iconic in Ukrainian print graphics.

== Biography ==
Bazylevych was born on 7 June 1926 in the town of Zhmerynka, then in the Vinnytsia region of the Ukrainian SSR, into the family of an engineer. He began to draw in childhood and in 1933 moved with his parents to Mariupol, where he attended an art circle at a metallurgical plant.

During the occupation of Mariupol by Nazi Germany, the Bazylevych family was forcibly taken to work in Germany; his father died from wounds received during a bombing, and his mother later managed to return to Mariupol with her son. In 1947 Bazylevych entered the Kharkiv Art Institute, where his teachers included Soviet artists Hryhorii Bondarenko, Iosif Daits and Adolf Strakhov. His graduation work consisted of illustrations to Igor Muratov's Bukovynska povist (Bukovinian Tale).

Bazylevych's first published book illustrations were for Gennadii Brezhnev's Fables, issued in 1951 by the Kharkiv book and newspaper publishing house. The following year his illustrations to Ivan Krylov's Fables were published by the Kyiv publishing house Molod (Molodizh). After graduating from the institute in 1953 he was assigned to work in Kyiv, where he collaborated with a range of publishing houses, including Molod, Raduga, Dnipro, Mystetstvo, Sovetskii pisatel, Sovetska shkola and the Kharkiv journal Znamia.

From 1956 Bazylevych participated in all‑Union, republican and international exhibitions, and he held solo exhibitions in Kyiv in 1961 and 1996. In the same year, 1956, he became a member of the Union of Artists of the Ukrainian SSR.

Bazylevych died on 30 June 2005 and was buried at Baikove Cemetery in Kyiv.

== Work ==
Bazylevych is particularly noted for his long‑term work on illustrations to Ivan Kotliarevsky's Eneida, on which he worked for about ten years, constantly revising and adding new images. His drawings for the poem combined expressive, flexible line with a limited range of local colours, and the characters are rendered with such solidity that many illustrations appear as independent easel‑style compositions. The depth of his engagement with the literary text was such that the illustrations have become inseparable from the book and are often regarded as a landmark of Ukrainian printed graphics.

For his illustrations to the 1968 Eneida edition published by Dnipro in Kyiv, Bazylevych received the honorary title Merited Artist of the Ukrainian SSR. His wider oeuvre includes illustrations for numerous works of Ukrainian, Russian and world literature, and he is frequently described as an outstanding illustrator of "immortal books".

== Family ==
His son, Oleksii Anatoliiovych Bazylevych (Ukrainian: Олексій Анатолійович Базилевич; born 6 February 1956 in Kyiv), is a Ukrainian graphic artist and book illustrator.

== Honours ==
Bazylevych received a number of state awards and honours, including:

- Medal "For Labour Distinction" (24 November 1960)
- Merited Artist of the Ukrainian SSR (1969)
- People's Artist of Ukraine (19 August 1993)
- All‑Ukrainian Award Vyznannia (Recognition) in the category "Fine and Decorative‑Applied Arts" (2001)

In May 2023 a lane in the Sviatoshynskyi district of Kyiv, formerly Chervonozavodskyi Lane, was renamed in honour of Anatolii Bazylevych.

== Selected bibliography on Bazylevych ==
- Анатолій Базилевич. Підготовчі рисунки до поеми Івана Котляревського «Енеїда» (Anatolii Bazylevych. Preparatory drawings for Ivan Kotliarevsky's poem Eneida), album of 80 pencil drawings, 2004, ISBN 966-95-771-4-4.
- «Неперевершений ілюстратор безсмертних книг: замітки про творчість Анатолія Базилевича» (Unsurpassed illustrator of immortal books: notes on the work of Anatolii Bazylevych), Holos Ukrainy, 9 December 2006.
- Nataliia Holubkova, article on Bazylevych in Stolichni novyny, no. 38, 2001.
