= Anatoli Egorov =

Soviet photographer

Anatoli Egorov was a Soviet photographer. He was a member of the Soviet Academy of Sciences. In 1981, he wrote to the Chairman of the KGB, Yuri Andropov, asking him to censor Mikhail Shatrov's anti-Soviet plays. His photographs were exhibited in Xi'an, China in 2003.
