= Anatoly Zhuravlev =

Russian swimming coach

- Born: November 27, 1958 (age 67)
- Occupation: Swimming coach
- Years active: 1989–present
- Awards: Honored Coach of Russia; Honored Coach of Ukraine

Anatoly Valentinovich Zhuravlev (Russian: Анатолий Валентинович Журавлев; born November 27, 1958) is a Russian swimming coach, Honored Coach of Russia, and coach of the Russian national swimming team since 2009. He served as the head coach of the Russian national team from 2013 to 2015.

== Biography ==
Anatoly Zhuravlev began his swimming career during the Soviet period, collaborating with Viktor Avdienko on the USSR national team. In 1989, he was invited to the Khanty-Mansi Autonomous Okrug, where he made a significant contribution to the development of swimming in the region.

He is considered a specialist, uniting young and experienced athletes, implementing modern training methods, and staying at the forefront of sports science and practice.

== Notable students ==
Oxana Verevka – Honored Master of Sports of Russia, European Champion, multiple medalist at World Championships.

== Achievements and awards ==
- Honored Coach of Russia;
- Honored Coach of Ukraine;
- Head coach of the Russian national swimming team;
- Senior coach of the Russian junior national team;
