= Anatoliy Tomkiv =

Ukrainian writer and journalist

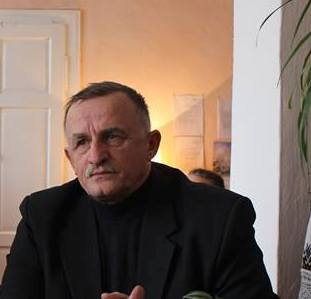
Anatoly Tomkiv

Anatoliy Mykolayovych Tomkiv (Ukrainian: Анато́лій Микола́йович Томків; 1 January 1954 – 6 August 2025) was a Ukrainian writer and journalist.

== Life and career ==
Tomkiv was born on 1 January 1954 in Konyatyn, Putylskyi. Since 1978 he was an announcer on the Chernivtsi Regional Radio and Television, editor and host of programs for children of the youth editorial office of the regional TV for the television of Ukraine.

Since the beginning of the 1990s, he worked as a chief specialist, head of the press service of the Representative of the President of Ukraine in the Chernivtsi Oblast, and later as a press secretary of the heads of the Chernivtsi Regional State Administration Ivan Hnatyshyn and Mykhailo Romaniv.

From 2009, he edited the newspaper of the Department of Internal Affairs of the Ministry of Internal Affairs of Ukraine in the Chernivtsi Oblast "Road Bulletin".

Tomkiv died on 6 August 2025, at the age of 71.
