= Anatolii Sloiko =

Ukrainian independent artist and curator (born 1980)

Anatolii Sloyko
- Born: Anatolii Sloyko; 1 August 1980 (age 45); Kyiv, Ukraine
- Years active: 2001 – present

Anatolii Sloiko (Ukrainian: Анатолій Слойко) (born 1 August 1980) is a Ukrainian independent artist and curator. His works vary from painting to writing and film making.

Anatolii studied philosophy and politology at The National University of Kyiv-Mohyla Academy. In summer 2006 he created and headed the unique Totoro Garden Gallery, which hosted more than 60 young artists during its short lifetime.

== Personal exhibitions ==
- 2008 The Unconsciousness Office Art ArtArsenal gallery, Kyiv, Ukraine
- 2007 Heart-to-heart ZEH gallery, Kyiv, Ukraine
- 2001 The art of whispering CCA, Kyiv, Ukraine
