= Anatoly Dolmatov =

Russian politician (1951–2026)

- Анатолий Долматов

Member of the Soviet of the Union
- In office 1987–1989

Personal details
- Born: Anatoly Petrovich Dolmatov; 29 January 1951 Neny, Irkutsk Oblast, Russian SFSR, Soviet Union
- Died: 7 April 2026 (aged 75) Cheremkhovsky District, Irkutsk Oblast, Russia
- Party: CPSU
- Education: Cheremkhovo Mining Technical College
- Occupation: Farmer

Anatoly Petrovich Dolmatov (Russian: Анатолий Петрович Долматов; 29 January 1951 – 7 April 2026) was a Russian politician. A member of the Communist Party of the Soviet Union, he served in the Soviet of the Union from 1987 to 1989.

Dolmatov died in Cheremkhovsky District on 7 April 2026, at the age of 75.
