= Anatoli Izmailov =

Russian footballer

Personal information
- Full name: Anatoli Aleksandrovich Izmailov
- Date of birth: 19 August 1978
- Place of birth: Podolsk, Russian SFSR
- Date of death: 7 April 2011 (aged 32)
- Place of death: Podolsk, Russia
- Height: 1.74 m (5 ft 8 1/2 in)
- Positions: Defender; midfielder

Senior career*
Years	Team	Apps	(Gls)
2001	FC Vityaz Podolsk	2	(0)
2003–2010	FC Vityaz Podolsk	227	(4)
- * Club domestic league appearances and goals

Anatoli Aleksandrovich Izmailov (nicknamed Tolya; Russian: Анатолий Александрович Измайлов; 19 August 1978 – 7 April 2011) was a Russian professional football player.

== Club career ==
Izmailov played two seasons in the Russian Football National League for FC Vityaz Podolsk. He later signed to FC Petrotrest Saint Petersburg for the 2011 season as a defender.

== Death ==
In 2011, Izmailov was found dead in his apartment of a gunshot wound to the head. Claims were made of a domestic dispute, a suicide, and violence by criminals whom he had debts to, none of which were verified by surviving family.

He was survived by a wife and two children, including an 8-year-old daughter. He was buried at the Krasnaya Gorka cemetery in Podolsk. The service was attended by all the members of his current team.
