= Anatoly Yarovyi =

Ukrainian attorney-at-law (born 1982)

- Анатолій Яровий
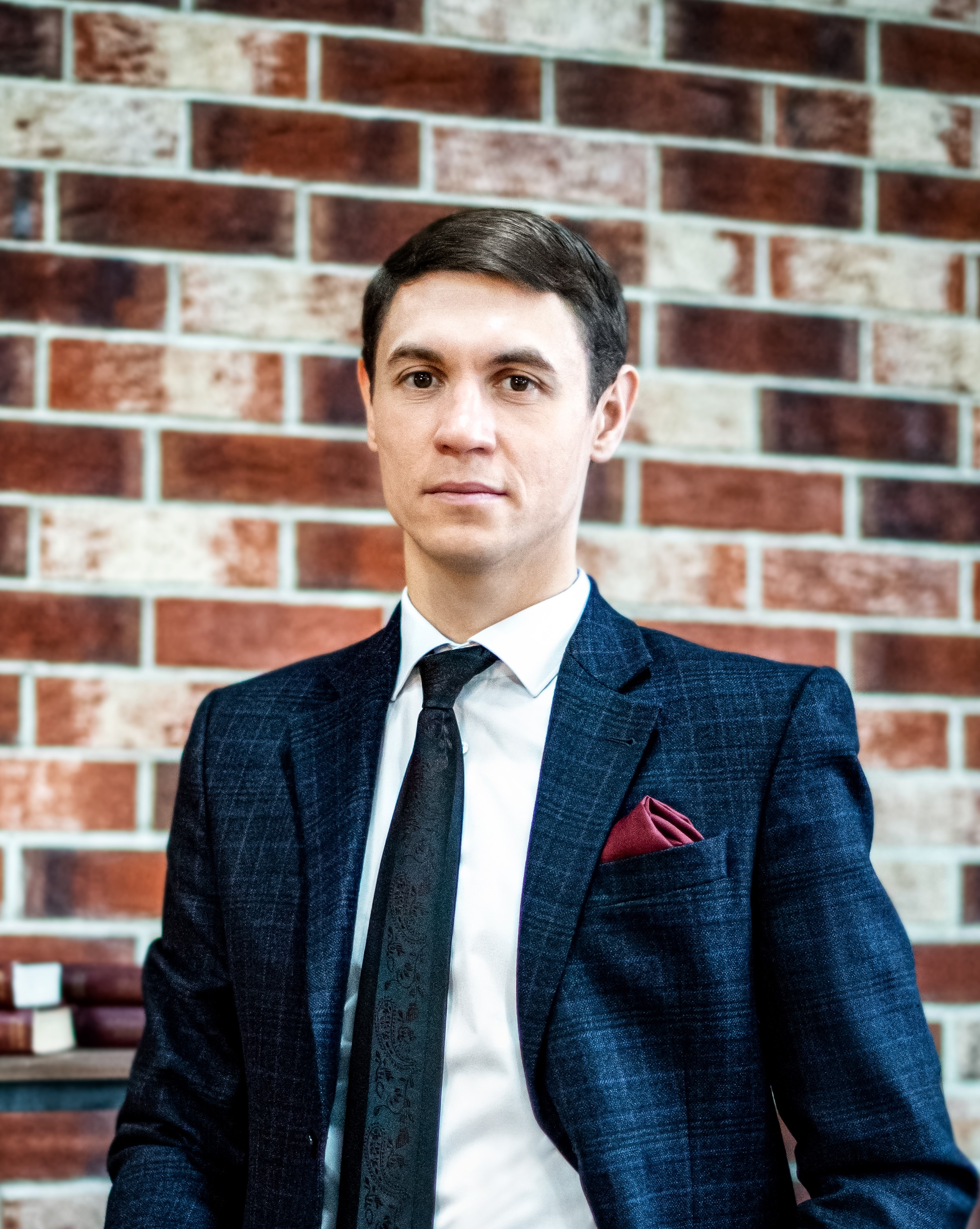
- Born: April 1, 1982 (age 44); Rivne, Ukraine
- Occupations: Lawyer, human rights defender
- Known for: Partner at Collegium of International Lawyers

Anatoly Yarovyi (born 1 April 1982, Rivne) is an attorney-at-law, human rights and criminal lawyer, and Partner at the law firm Collegium of International Lawyers.

== Career ==
In 2021, he was one of the candidates for the position of judge at the European Court of Human Rights from Ukraine.

Anatoly is the author of several articles, including in Ukrainska Pravda, focusing on judicial and law enforcement reforms.

He is a member of the Association of Lawyers of Ukraine.
