= Anatoly Kondratenko =

Ukrainian-Soviet physics professor (born 1935)

- Анатолий Кондратенко
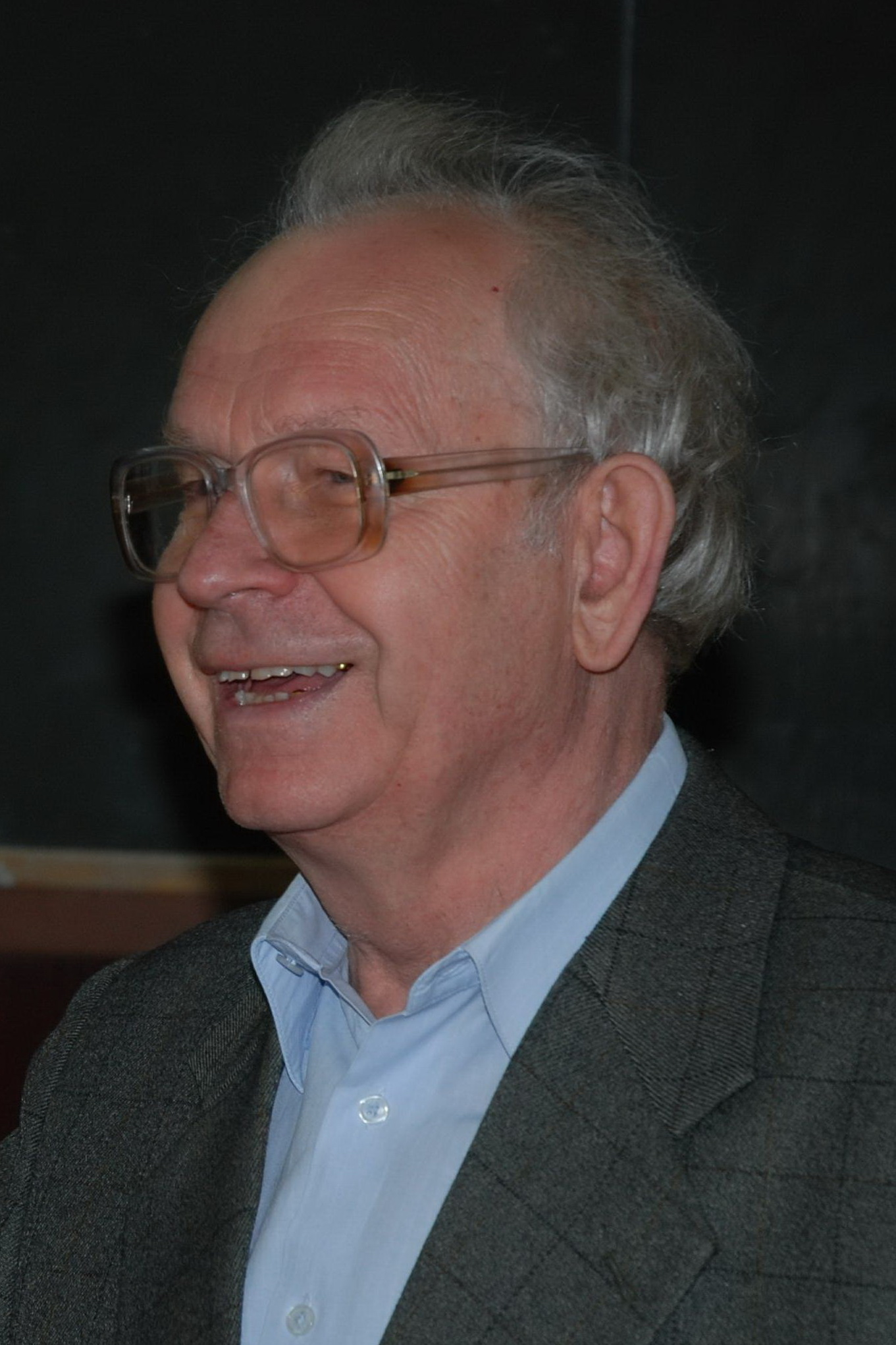
- Born: December 6, 1935 (age 90); Leningrad, Soviet Union

Anatoly Kondratenko (Russian: Анатолий Кондратенко, Ukrainian: Анатолій Кіндратенко; 6 December 1935, Leningrad, Soviet Union) is a Professor of Physics at University of Kharkiv. A theoretical physicist who has been working in the field of plasma and plasma electronics for over 50 years, Kondratenko has written over 270 papers. Under his supervision, 24 PhD and 7 Doctor of Science dissertations have been written Kondratenko, along with his students and co-authors, pioneered the study of the electrodynamics of plasma waveguides. He explained from a theoretical point of view the existence of surface ion acoustic waves, cyclotron waves and eigen waves on the plasma-metal interface. In addition to this, he laid the groundwork for the theory of plasma electronics.

Kondratenko received his undergraduate degree in Theoretical physics in 1958 in the former Soviet Union (University of Kharkiv). He obtained his PhD (1965) and his Doctor of Science degree (1971) at UFTI, Kharkiv. His work has been featured in numerous newspaper and magazine articles in the United States, Europe, Ukraine, the Soviet Union and in many popular books.

Kondratenko took and continues to take part in the political life of Ukraine. He was a principal member of the Kharkiv chapter of Rukh in the 1990s, and continues to co-chair the chapter. He is also the head editor of the all-Ukrainian children's newspaper "Zhuravlik".

== Books ==
- Анатолий Николаевич Кондратенко (1976). Плазменные волноводы. Атомиздат.
- Анатолий Николаевич Кондратенко (1979). Проникновение поля в плазму. Атомиздат.
- Анатолий Николаевич Кондратенко (1985). Поверхностные и объемные волны в ограниченной плазме. Энергоатомиздат.
- Анатолий Николаевич Кондратенко; Владимир Михайлович Куклин (1988). Основы плазменной электроники. Энергоатомиздат. ISBN 978-5-283-03903-9.
