= Anatoly Akishin =

Soviet space materials scientist (born 1926)

Anatoly Ivanovich Akishin
- Анатолий Иванович Акишин
- Born: 9 June 1926; Moscow
- Education: Moscow Power Engineering Institute
- Scientific career
- Fields: Space materials science

Anatoly Ivanovich Akishin (Russian: Анатолий Иванович Акишин; born 9 June 1926) is a Soviet and Russian scientist in the field of space materials science and nuclear physics, professor.

== Biography ==
He was born on 9 June 1926 in Moscow.

In 1950 he graduated from the Moscow Power Engineering Institute, in 1958 defended his thesis, in 1977 he was awarded the title of professor.

He carried out research work in the field of physical electronics, radiation physics, forecasting and imitation of the impact of various space factors on materials and elements of space vehicles, testing materials of a thermonuclear reactor, radiation technology.

In 1979 he received the State Prize of the USSR as a member of a group of scientists for his work in the field of space research.

As a scientist, he became famous for the studies related to methods of simulating the effects of the space environment on materials and elements of space vehicles.

== Literature ==
- Акишин А.И. Ионная бомбардировка в вакууме. -М. : Госэнергоиздат, 1963, 144 с.
- Effects of Space Condition on Materials.A.I.Akishin (Editor).Nova Science═ Publishers, Inc. N.Y., 2001, p. 199
- Akishin A.I., Tyutrin Yu.I., Khorosh A.G. Destruction of insulators in superconducting magnetic systems for use in thermonuclear reactors due to electrostatic charge under gamma and electron irradiation. J. of Nuclear Materials, 1991-1994(1992), p. 1372-1373.
- Акишин А.И., Булгаков Ю.В., Васильев С.С., Вернов С.Н., Николаев В.С., Теплов И.Б. Моделирование радиационного воздействия космической среды на материалы и элементы КА. Proc. XVII Congress YAF, North Holl. Co., 1968, с. 279–291.
- Акишин А.И., Новиков Л.С. Электризация космических аппаратов. -М.: Знание, 1985/3, 63 с.
- Акишин А.И.Методы радиационных испытаний космических материалов.Учебное пособие.Из-во Мос.гос.ун-та.2005,с.143.
