= Anatoli Bashlakov =

Russian general, former chief of the Plesetsk Cosmodrome

Anatoli Bashlakov (Russian: Башлаков, Анатолий Александрович; born May 11, 1957) was a Russian lieutenant general, best known as the commander of the Plesetsk Cosmodrome.

After graduating from the Riga Higher Military Political School, he further graduated from the Military-Political Academy, department of missiles. In 2000 he graduated from the Military Academy of the General Staff of the Armed Forces of Russia and appointed first deputy of the commander of the Plesetsk Cosmodrome. In 2003 he was promoted to the position of the commander of the cosmodrome. In 2007 he became head of the Main Directorate for Educational Work at the Russian Ministry of Defense. In February 2010 he was discharged from military service, citing health reasons.

In 2011 he was sentenced to 7 years of penal colony, accused of bribery during the time when he was the commander of the cosmodrome. The details of the case are unknown because the proceedings were carried out in secret.
