= Anatoly Zhigljavsky =

British professor physicist (born 1953)

Anatoly Aleksandrovich Zhigljavsky (born 19 November 1953) is a professor of statistics in the School of Mathematics at Cardiff University. He has authored 12 monographs and over 150 papers in refereed journals. His research interests include stochastic and high-dimensional global optimisation, time series analysis, multivariate data analysis, statistical modeling in market research, probabilistic methods in search and number theory.

He is the Director of the Centre for Optimisation and its Applications, an interdisciplinary centre which encourages joint research and applied projects among members of the Schools of Mathematics, Computer Science and Business and Manufacturing Engineering Centre at Cardiff University. It also encourages increased awareness of the rapidly growing field of optimisation through publications, conferences, joint research and student exchange.

His books include Theory of Global Random Search, Stochastic Global Optimization, Analysis of time series structure: SSA and related techniques, Dynamical Search: Applications of Dynamical Systems in Search and Optimization, and Singular Spectrum Analysis for Time Series. His books received positive comments from reviewers.

Zhigljavsky received an MSc in 1976, a PhD in 1981, and a Habilitation in 1987 from the St. Petersburg State University, Russia.

In 2019 Anatoly Zhigljavsky received the Constantin Caratheodory Prize for his outstanding work and significant contributions in the field of global optimisation.
