= Anatoly Shevtsov =

Russian politician (1933–2025)

- Анатолий Шевцов

Member of the Congress of People's Deputies of Russia
- In office 16 May 1990 – 4 October 1993

Personal details
- Born: Anatoly Egorovich Shevtsov; 15 August 1933 Unecha, Western Oblast, Russian SFSR, USSR
- Died: 12 December 2025 (aged 92) Poselok L'nozavoda, Smolensk Oblast, Russia
- Party: CPSU
- Education: All-Union Correspondence Textile Institute
- Occupation: Engineer

Anatoly Egorovich Shevtsov (Russian: Анатолий Егорович Шевцов; 15 August 1933 – 12 December 2025) was a Russian politician. A member of the Communist Party of the Soviet Union, he served in the Congress of People's Deputies from 1990 to 1993.

Shevtsov died in Poselok L'nozavoda on 12 December 2025, at the age of 92.
