= Anatoly Savinsky =

Belarusian footballer

Personal information
- Date of birth: 23 January 1986 (age 40)
- Place of birth: Belarusian SSR
- Height: 1.84 m (6 ft 0 in)
- Position: Goalkeeper

Youth career
- 2001–2003: Slavia Mozyr

Senior career*
Years	Team	Apps	(Gls)
2004	Vertikal Kalinkovichi	2	(0)
2005	Polesye Kozenki	14	(0)
2005	Veras Nesvizh	1	(0)
2006	Polesye Kozenki	8	(0)
2006	Veras Nesvizh	6	(0)
2007–2008	Vedrich-97 Rechitsa	20	(0)
2009–2013	Slavia Mozyr	16	(0)
- * Club domestic league appearances and goals as of 4 December 2013

Anatoly Savinsky (Belarusian: Анатоль Савiнскi; Russian: Анатолий Савинский; born 23 January 1986) is a retired Belarusian footballer. His latest club was Slavia Mozyr.
