= Anatoli Piskunov =

Russian footballer

Personal information
- Full name: Anatoli Anatolyevich Piskunov
- Date of birth: 2 January 1949 (age 77)
- Place of birth: Tatishchevo, Russian SFSR
- Height: 1.83 m (6 ft 0 in)
- Position: Forward

Senior career*
Years	Team	Apps	(Gls)
1969	FC Volga Kalinin	18	(3)
1970–1971	FC Dynamo Moscow	19	(3)
1972–1976	FC Lokomotiv Moscow	117	(27)
1977	FC Kuban Krasnodar	36	(5)
- * Club domestic league appearances and goals

Anatoli Anatolyevich Piskunov (Russian: Анатолий Анатольевич Пискунов; born 2 January 1949) is a former Russian professional footballer.

He made his professional debut in the Soviet First League in 1969 for FC Volga Kalinin.

== Honours ==
- Soviet Top League runner-up: 1970.
- Soviet Cup winner: 1970.
- European Cup Winners' Cup 1971–72 finalist (1 game).
