= Anatoliy Smirnov =

Russian economist and politician (1941–2022)

Chairman of the Yoshkar-Ola Executive Committee
- In office 1981–1987

Personal details
- Born: Anatoliy Alekseyevich Smirnov; 11 November 1941 Malye Shalai, Yaransky District, Kirov Oblast, Russian SFSR, Soviet Union
- Died: 15 September 2022 (aged 80) Yoshkar-Ola, Russia
- Party: CPSU
- Occupation: Economist, politician

Anatoliy Alekseyevich Smirnov (Russian: Анатолий Алексеевич Смирнов; 11 November 1941 – 15 September 2022) was a Soviet and Russian economist and politician. A member of the Communist Party of the Soviet Union, he served as chairman of the Yoshkar-Ola Executive Committee from 1981 to 1987.

Smirnov was a recipient of two Orders of the Badge of Honour and an Order of the Red Banner of Labour. He died in Yoshkar-Ola on 15 September 2022, at the age of 80.
