= Anatoly Emelin =

Russian ice hockey player

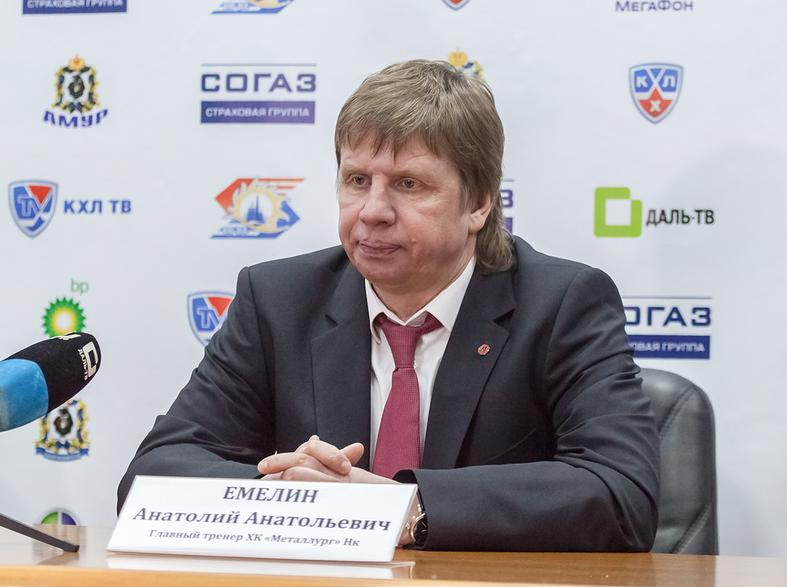
- Born: October 3, 1964 (age 61) Ufa, Soviet Union
- Height: 5 ft 9 in (175 cm)
- Weight: 178 lb (81 kg; 12 st 10 lb)
- Position: Right wing
- Shot: Left
- Played for: Salavat Yulaev Ufa; Lada Togliatti
- National team: Russia
- Playing career: 1982–1998

Anatoly Anatolevich Emelin (Russian: Анатолий Анатольевич Емелин, Anatoliy Yemelin); (born October 3, 1964) is a former Russian ice hockey player. He played right winger and scored 229 goals in 596 official games. After 1997-98 season, Emelin finished his player career and became a coach in HC Lada Togliatti. In 2006, he was promoted to head coach of the team.

== Playing career ==
Emelin's player career started in 1982 in the team of his home region capital, Salavat Yulaev Ufa, where he was playing until 1990 (with a two-season break in SKA Sverdlovsk). After that, Anatoly accepted the invitation of newly hired Lada coach Gennadiy Tsigurov, and helped to lead his new team to the highest division of Soviet hockey. During the 1992–93 season, Emelin tried himself in Sweden, but decided to return to Lada. Emelin retired in 1998.

Despite the fact that Anatoly's team became Russian Champions twice and won European Cup during his career, he was invited to the national team only once. In 1994, he participated in World Championship, where he scored 2 goals in six games.

== Trivia ==
As for now (2006), Anatoly Emelin is the youngest head coach of Russian Hockey Super League. Despite that, he won his first games against former Lada coaches, Gennadiy Tsigurov and Petr Vorobiev, with the same score - 3:1.

== Career statistics ==
			Regular season					Playoffs
Season	Team	League	GP	G	A	Pts	PIM	GP	G	A	Pts	PIM
1982–83	Salavat Yulaev Ufa	USSR	39	6	1	7	8	—	—	—	—	—
1983–84	Salavat Yulaev Ufa	USSR-2	58	36	?	?	?	—	—	—	—	—
1984–85	Salavat Yulaev Ufa	USSR-2	57	29	15	44	74	—	—	—	—	—
1985–86	Salavat Yulaev Ufa	USSR	22	5	5	10	18	—	—	—	—	—
1986–87	Salavat Yulaev Ufa	USSR	21	4	1	5	20	—	—	—	—	—
1987–88	SKA Sverdlovsk	USSR-2	62	23	14	37	64	—	—	—	—	—
1988–89	SKA Sverdlovsk	USSR-2	7	1	0	1	0	—	—	—	—	—
1988–89	Salavat Yulaev Ufa	USSR-2	31	11	9	20	16	—	—	—	—	—
1989–90	Salavat Yulaev Ufa	USSR-2	71	31	34	65	45	—	—	—	—	—
1990–91	Lada Togliatti	USSR-2	33	13	17	30	20	—	—	—	—	—
1991–92	Lada Togliatti	CIS	23	8	6	14	16	—	—	—	—	—
1992–93	Avesta BK	SWE-2	30	17	15	32	40	—	—	—	—	—
1993–94	Lada Togliatti	IHL	38	19	13	32	44	9	5	5	10	2
1994–95	Lada Togliatti	IHL	51	19	16	35	22	12	6	3	9	4
1995–96	Lada Togliatti	IHL	52	24	17	41	30	7	1	4	5	20
1996–97	Lada Togliatti	RSL	38	15	18	33	24	11	2	2	4	10
1997–98	Lada Togliatti	RSL	45	2	6	8	16	—	—	—	—	—

== International statistics ==
Year	Team	Event	Place	GP	G	A	Pts	PIM
1994	Russia	WC	5th	6	2	0	2	8
