= Anatoly Lavrentievich Vysotsky =

Soviet and Ukrainian artist

Vysotsky Anatoly Lavrentievich
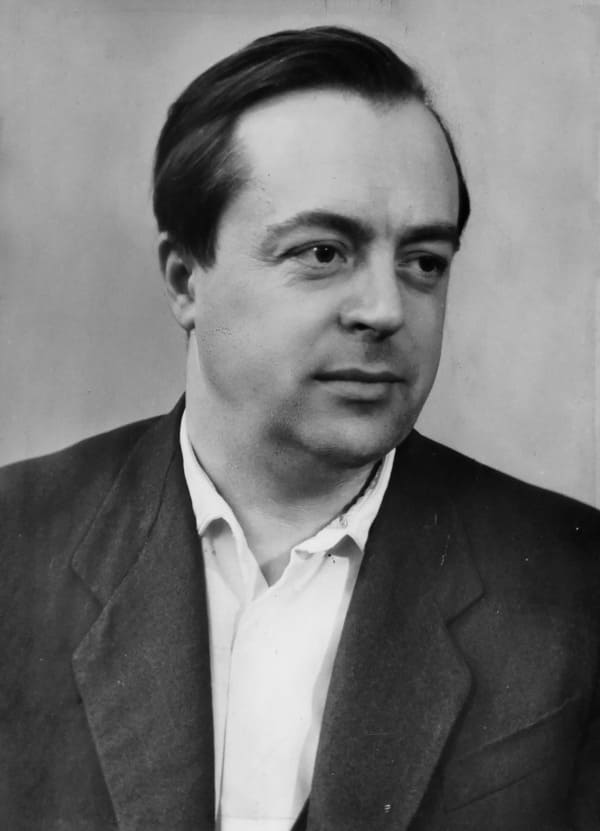
- Born: 8 August 1924; Sumy region, Ukrainian Soviet Socialist Republic
- Died: 15 October 1996 (aged 72); Kyiv, Ukraine
- Resting place: Baikove Cemetery, Kyiv, Ukraine
- Style: Social realism
- Website: www.vega-stargallery.com

Anatoly Lavrentyevich Vysotsky (August 8, 1924, Putivl district, Sumy region, Ukraine - October 15, 1996, Kyiv, Ukraine) was a Soviet and Ukrainian artist working in the style of social realism.

== Biography ==
Vysotsky was born in 1924 in a military family in the Putivl district, Sumy region.

In 1928, together with his parents, sister and brother, he moved to Kyiv, where he graduated from the seven-year school.

In 1941, living in Kyiv, his family was under German-Fascist occupation.

From 1943 to 1945, he was conscripted into the Red Army fighter battalion.

He was fascinated by painting at an early school age, and his first works (self-portraits) appeared during his studies in art school. Later he graduated from the Shevchenko State Art School.

After the war, he worked in the Kyiv Painting and Sculpture Combine, then in the Kyiv Society of Artists, then in the Art Fund of the Ukrainian SSR.

He also worked in artistic creative groups in the All-Union Houses of Creativity in the Tver Region, in the city of Sednev, Chernigov Region, as well as in the Baltic States and many other countries.

He was friends with Tatiana Nilovna Yablonskaya, who was the curator of the artist's creative way.

Since 1963 he took an active part in all-Union, republican and international exhibitions. The artist's works were shown in Japan, Sweden, Greece, Germany, and the US. Works by the Soviet painter were exhibited and sold at auctions of the world famous Japanese painting gallery Gallery Nakamura. Several works have been acquired by museums in San Francisco and Los Angeles. Many are kept in museums in Ukraine, Russia, Japan, and the United States.

He created more than 340 paintings, portraits, and still lifes. Most are exhibited in the private gallery of Denis Balashov, grandson of the artist: Vega Star Gallery, in Los Angeles, California, US.

Vysotsky died in 1996. He is buried in the Baikove Cemetery, Kyiv.

== Family ==
- Son - Vysotsky Vladimir Anatolievich, biologist
- Grandson - Sergey Vladimirovich Vysotsky, lawyer
- Daughter - Tatiana Vladimirovna, researcher of Igor Sikorsky Kyiv Polytechnic Institute
- Grandson - Balashov Denis - film distributor, producer, philanthropist, creator of expositions of works by Anatoly Vysotsky
