= Anatoly Khrupov =

Soviet photographer

Anatoly Khrupov was a Soviet photographer. His photographs were published in Soviet Life.
