= Anatoly Oleynik =

Russian-Soviet chemistry professor (1936–2019)

Anatoly Vasilyevich Oleynik (Russian: Анатолий Васильевич Олейник; July 18, 1936 – October 3, 2019) was a merited professor of chemistry at the University of Nizhni Novgorod.

He was serving as the scientific supervisor for the photochemistry lab as well as the vice-rector for scientific research at University of Nizhni Novgoro, Russia.

Oleynik graduated from Gorky State University in 1959 with a Candidate of Sciences degree, with a special focus on organic chemistry.

The Doctor of Sciences dissertation was entitled "Physical and chemical properties of aromatic azides and the mechanism of photochemical transformations in photosensitive materials on their base".

Oleynik had 220 published papers and 25 Russian issued patents.
