= Anatoliy Solodun =

Ukrainian water polo player

Personal information
- Nationality: Ukrainian
- Born: 24 February 1962 (age 63)

Sport
- Sport: Water polo

Anatoliy Solodun (born 24 February 1962) is a Ukrainian water polo player. He competed in the men's tournament at the 1996 Summer Olympics.
