= Anatoli Kartayev =

Russian and Soviet ice hockey player and coach

- Born: April 12, 1947 (age 78) Chelyabinsk, RSFSR, Soviet Union
- Position: Forward
- Played for: Traktor Chelyabinsk
- National team: Soviet Union
- Playing career: 1971–1978

Anatoli Zinovyevich Kartayev (Russian: Анатолий Зиновьевич Картаев; born April 12, 1947) is a former Russian and Soviet professional ice hockey player and coach.

== Biography ==
Kartayev was a pupil of the Chelyabinsk sports club "Voskhod" (first trainer S. Sayfutdinov). He played from 1971–78 for Traktor in the position of forward.

In 1969 Kartayev graduated from the sports faculty of the Chelyabinsk Teacher Training College

He was a bronze prize winner of the USSR championship of 1977, and was a finalist of the Cup of the USSR of 1973.

Kartayev trained the hockey teams the Metallurgist (Chelyabinsk) (1984–87), Motorist (Karagandy) (1989 — 1991), Traktor (Chelyabinsk), worked in China and Yugoslavia.

From 1996 to 2002 Kartayev headed the federation of hockey of Chelyabinsk Oblast.

Kartayev was the head coach of hockey club Kazakhmys (Satbayev, Kazakhstan) from October 2003 until December 1, 2007. Together with Kazakhmys he became the champion of Kazakhstan in the 2005–06 season. In 2007 he worked as the head coach of the national team of Kazakhstan.
