= Anatoly Shesteryuk =

Russian environmental lawyer (born 1952)

Anatoly Stepanovich Shesteryuk (Russian: Анатолий Степанович Шестерюк; 6 July 1952) is a Russian doctor of Juridical Science, Professor in the Department of Environmental and Land Law of Lomonosov Moscow State University Faculty of Law.

== Education ==
Shesteryuk was born on July 6, 1952, in Khozarasp, Khoresmskaya region in what is today Uzbekistan.

Shesteryuk entered the Faculty of Law of Leningrad State University and graduated in 1975. He studied full-time at the graduate school of Leningrad State University in the Department of Land and Collective Farming Law from 1975 to 1978.

Shesteryuk defended the candidate's dissertation on the "Theoretical Problems of Codification of the USSR Environmental Protection Legislation" (thesis supervisor – Professor A.M. Kalandadze) on April 26, 1979.

== Career ==
Shesteryuk started to work in the position of Assistant of the Department of Land and Collective Farm Law of Leningrad State University and was Associate Professor of the department from June 1, 1981, to January 23, 1993.

Shesteryuk served as an advisor for the permanent commissions of the Interparliamentary Assembly Council of the Commonwealth of Independent States from January 23, 1993, to March 18, 1994.

Shesteryuk worked as Associate Professor in the Department of Legal Protection of the Environment, Leningrad State University from March 19, 1994, to April 25, 2001.He defended the doctoral thesis on the "Environmental Law: Methodology Issues" at the Faculty of Law of Lomonosov Moscow State University on December 10, 2000.

Shesteryuk has been working in the Russian Federal Property Fund agencies and Moscow government agencies, as well as in the position of Head of Inspective Environmental Control Directorate, Moscow Department of Natural Resources Management and Environmental Protection since 2003.

Anatoly Shesteryuk has been working in the Russian Federal Property Fund agencies and Moscow government agencies, as well as in the position of Head of Inspective Environmental Control Directorate, Moscow Department of Natural Resources Management and Environmental Protection since 2003.

He took a position as Deputy Director of the Federal Property Management Agency area office in Moscow in July 2008. He became Head of the Federal Property Management Agency area office in Moscow in June 2009.

Professor Anatoly Shesteryuk, Doctor of Juridical Science, is mentioned in 61 sources in the ConsultantPlus reference system databases.took a position as Deputy Director of the Federal Property Management Agency area office in Moscow in July 2008. He became Head of the office in June 2009.

Shesteryuk is mentioned in 61 sources in the ConsultantPlus reference system databases.

=== Teaching activities ===
Shesteryuk has been working at Lomonosov Moscow State University since February 7, 2004 (part-time). He gives a special course "Russian Federation Entity Legislation on State Administration and Governmental Environment Protection Control (Through the Example of Moscow)."

Shesteryuk's research interests are focused on the issues of environmental law methodology and the issues of codifying environmental legislation.

== Publication ==
Shesteryuk has authored of over 50 academic papers including 3 monographs and a number of study guides (co-authored), including:

- "Environmental Legislation System in the USSR" // Legal studies. 1978. # 4. P.35–42;
- "Issues of Codifying Environmental Legislation." L.: Leningrad State University Publishing House. 1984. – 184 p.;
- "Soviet Law and Environmental Protection" // 70 Years of Soviet State and Law. L.: 1987. P. 44–65;
- "Environmental Law of Russia: Textbook." M.: Institute for World Economy and Politics. 1997 – 230 p. (co-authorship);
- "Development of Environmental Studies in Sweden" (thesis) // Environmental Law of Russia. Digest of Research and Practice Conferences. Anniversary issue. 1996–1998 / Edited by Prof. A.K. Golichenkov. M.: Zertsalo. 1999. P. 181–183;
- "Environmental Law: Theory and Methodology Issues." Saint Petersburg: St. Petersburg State University Publishing House. 2000. – 92 p.
- "Environmental Law and Issues of Codifying the Russian Federation Environmental Legislation" // Environmental Law of Russia. Digest of Research and Practice Conferences. Anniversary issue. 1995–2004: In 3 Vol. / Edited by Prof. A.K. Golichenkov. M.: TISSO. 2004. V. 2 P. 264–271;
