= Anatoly Pavlovich Shikman =

Russian historian (born 1948)

Anatoly Pavlovich Shikman (Russian: Анато́лий Па́влович Ши́кман; born March 12, 1948) is a Russian historian and writer, and a former teacher of Moscow School No. 45. He is one of the authors of "Book: Encyclopedia" and "Moscow Encyclopedia".

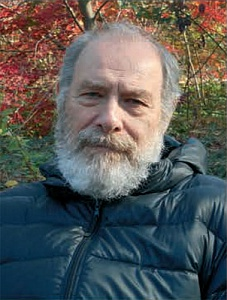
Anatoly Pavlovich Shikman

== Biography ==
Shikman was born in Moscow in the family of an American-born Jew Pavel (Paul) Morisovich Shikman. His grandfather, who was born in Poland, emigrated with his wife in 1913 to Canada, then to the USA, and then, in 1931, along with his children, Paul and Norma, to the USSR.

After graduating from eight classes, he went to work: he was a driver, a loader, a librarian, worked in the theater. At the same time, he studied at evening school. After serving in the Navy, he entered the Faculty of History of the Moscow State Pedagogical Institute named after V.I. Lenin, which he graduated in 1975. Shikman frequently changing jobs: he taught history and art history and worked as a senior researcher at the Russian State Archive of Ancient Documents. In addition to his various jobs, in 1981 Shikman began publishing articles and books on remarkable Russians, the history of Moscow, culture, pedagogy and bibliography.

In 1986, Leonid Isidorovich Milgram, the prominent director of director of the Moscow gymnasium No. 45, offered Shikman a job. Milgram who managed to create a spirit of freedom in the school, and he fostered respect towards both student and teachers. Two years later, in 1988, he wrote his first essay on classified historical archives (Absolutely unclassified // Soviet bibliography. - 1988. - No. 6. - P. 3-12.), which laid the foundation for a number of fundamental works on the history of Soviet censorship. In 1997, his fundamental biographical reference book “Figures of Russian History” was published.

In 2008, he left teaching for health reasons and he is presently engaged in research and literary work.

In 2016, he emigrated to his ancestral homeland, the United States.

== Books by Shikman ==
- 7 Kirov Street, published by "Moscow Worker" as part of the series "Biography of the Moscow House" (1989).
- Obelisk in the Alexander Gardens - Lives of the Great Socialists, published by "Enlightenment" (1990). // This high school text book compiled a series of essays dedicated to the thinkers and revolutionaries whose names were carved in the obelisk that stands in the Alexander Gardens, near the walls of the Kremlin.
- Figures of National History, published by AST-Ltd (1997)
- The Opening of History, published by "Moscow Lyceum" (2000) // The book provides answers to basic questions about the development of historical science in the form of a story.
- History of Russia. Biography Dictionary for Schools, a dictionary intended for history teachers and students, published by Moscow Publishers-Press (2001)
- Who's Who in Russian History, a biographical dictionary, including over 700 articles about prominent Russian figures, published by "Vagrius" (2003)
- Summary of the Time. Works and the Days of Alexander Ratner” (compiled by Abram Reytblat and Anatoly Shikman) (Konspekt vremeni: trudy i dni Aleksandra Ratnera), a book devoted to the life and work of historian Alexander Ratner, published by "New Literary Review" (2007)
- Nikolay Morozov. Hoax in the length of the century. — М.: Ves' Mir, 2016. — p288. — ISBN 978-5-7777-0623-2.
- What was remembered. M-Graphics Publishing. Boston. 2022.
- Khrabrovitsky A.V. Essay on my life. A diary. Meetings / Introductory article, drafting preparation of the text and comments A.P.Shikman. — М.: NLO, 2012.— p384
