= Anatoly Makarenko =

Soviet-Russian engineer and politician (1936–2023)

Member of the Supreme Soviet of the RSFSR
- In office 1986–1988

Personal details
- Born: Anatoly Innokentyevich Makarenko; 1 November 1936 Tsvetkovka, Far Eastern Krai, Russian SFSR, USSR
- Died: 5 June 2023 (aged 86) Moscow, Russia
- Party: CPSU
- Occupation: Engineer

Anatoly Innokentyevich Makarenko (Russian: Анатолий Иннокентьевич Макаренко; 1 November 1936 – 5 June 2023) was a Soviet-Russian engineer and politician.

== Biography ==
A member of the Communist Party, Makarenko served in the Supreme Soviet of the RSFSR from 1986 to 1988.

Makarenko died in Moscow on 5 June 2023, at the age of 86.
