= Anatoli Koltuniewicz =

Australian basketball player

Personal information
- Nationality: Australian
- Born: 16 November 1948 (age 76)

Sport
- Sport: Basketball

Anatoli Koltuniewicz (born 16 November 1948) is an Australian basketball player. He competed in the men's tournament at the 1972 Summer Olympics.
