= Anatoly Sharpenak =

Anatoly E. Sharpenak
- Born: Анатолий Эрнестович Шарпенак; 1895; Moscow, Russian Empire
- Died: 1969 (aged 73–74); Moscow, Soviet Union
- Known for: Work on dental caries and other aspects of dentistry
- Scientific career
- Fields: Biochemistry

Anatoly Ernestovich Sharpenak (Russian: Анатолий Эрнестович Шарпенак; 1895 – 1969) was a Russian biochemist.

== Biography ==
In 1939 Sharpenak organized a biochemical department at the Moscow Stomatological Institute (now Moscow State University of Medicine and Dentistry). He was the chair of the department until 1969.

While heading the department at the Moscow Stomatological Institute, he also held the following position:

- From 1945 to 1969, Head of the Laboratory of Protein Metabolism Institute of Nutrition, Russian Academy of Medical Sciences (now the Laboratory of metabolism and energy of the Federal government agency "Scientific Research Institute of Nutrition, Russian Academy of Medical Sciences.

== Scientific activities ==
Employee of the Institute, Doctor A.E. Sharpenak, studies the work of a blood enzyme on himself, depending on the diet.

— Y. S. Przheborovsky, Progress of Chemistry during World War II. Article I. Chemistry in Russia during the period from 1918 - 1921, The Red New Era (Kranaya Nov'). -1922. -N 1. -C. 301-309

While working at the Institute of Nutrition, Sharpenak, who studied protein metabolism, has contributed to the study of some amino acids and their optimum balance.

Sharpenak pointed out that the diet should take into account not only the total protein content, but also the content of individual amino acids. The effect of protein quality of the diet on the body depends not only on the absolute content of individual amino acids in the diet, but also on the balance between them.

=== Sharpenak's theory of dental caries ===
In 1949, after numerous experiments, Sharpenak proposed that dental caries was due to insufficient supply in the organs and tissues protein of B vitamins, and an excess of carbohydrates.

== Publications ==
- Sharpenak, A. E. (1966). Organic chemistry: a textbook for students of medical and dental institutions (2nd ed.). Moscow.
- Sharpenak, A. E.; Kosenko, S. A. (1965). Workshop on organic chemistry textbook for medical students. Moscow.
- Sharpenak, A. E. (December 1972). "Prophylaxis of dental caries". Rev Stomatol Chir Maxillofac (in French). 73 (8): 643–654. PMID 4514930.
- Sharpenak, A. E.; Bobyleva, V. R.; Gorozhankina, L. A.; Komnova, Z. D. (July–August 1971). "The role of protein and lysine in preventing dental caries". Vopr Pitan (in Russian). 30 (4): 3–7. PMID 5141599.
- Sharpenak, A. E. (December 1967). "The etiology and prevention of dental caries". N Y State Dent J. 33 (10): 592–600. PMID 5234447.
- Sharpenak, A. E. (November–December 1964). "The problem of dental caries prevention". Vopr Med Khim. 10: 563–575. PMID 14335702.
- Sharpenak, A. E.; Bobyleva, V. R.; Gorozhankina, L. A. (March–April 1964). "Role of protein, lysine, certain mineral substances and vitamins A and D in prevention of dental caries". Fed Proc Transl Suppl. 23: 423–426. PMID 14145693.
- Sharpenak, A. E.; Shishova, O. A.; Gorozhankina, L. A. (June 1959). "Effect of ionizing radiations in animals fed food containing various levels of histidine". Med Radiol (Mosk). 4 (6): 37–41. PMID 13673816.
- Sharpenak, A. E. (January–February 1959). "Quantitative human requirement for proteins and individual amino acids". Vopr Pitan. 18 (1): 73–83. PMID 13648245.
- Sharpenak, A. E. (November–December 1957). "Human requirement for individual amino acids". Vopr Pitan. 16 (6): 9–17. PMID 13544198.
- Sharpenak, A. E. (September–October 1955). "Material for quantitative calculation of amino acid content of proteins in nutrition in normal and pathological conditions". Vopr Pitan. 14 (5): 48–53. PMID 13299891.
