= Anatoly Akeyev =

Russian politician (1954–2025)

- Анатолий Акеев

Member of the Supreme Soviet of the Soviet Union
- In office 4 March 1984 – 26 March 1989

Personal details
- Born: Anatoly Ayevich Akeyev; 1954 Tigilsky District, Kamchatka Oblast, Russian SFSR, USSR
- Died: 13 September 2025 (aged 71) Kamchatka Krai, Russia
- Political party: CPSU
- Occupation: Herder

Anatoly Ayevich Akeyev (Russian: Анатолий Айевич Акеев; 1954 – 13 September 2025) was a Russian politician. A member of the Communist Party of the Soviet Union, he served in the Supreme Soviet from 1984 to 1989.

Akeyev died on 13 September 2025, at the age of 71.
