= Anatoly Yegorov =

Soviet water polo player (born 1922)

Personal information
- Nationality: Soviet
- Born: 1922

Sport
- Sport: Water polo

Anatoly Yegorov (Russian: Анатолий Егоров; born 1922) was a Soviet water polo player. He competed in the men's tournament at the 1952 Summer Olympics.
