= Anatoly Ufimtsev =

Russian engineer and aviation pioneer (1880–1936)

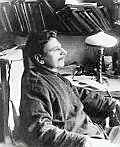

Anatoly Georgievich Ufimtsev (Russian: Анатолий Георгиевич Уфимцев; 1880–1936) was a Russian engineer and aviation pioneer. He was born in Kursk. He invented a radial engine for which he received a Russian patent and designed his own vehicles "Spheroplane 1" (Сфероплан No.1) and "Spheroplane 2" (Сфероплан No.2). He later designed and built agricultural equipment and wind turbines.

== Ufimtsev's inventions ==
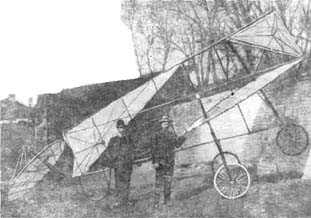
Spheroplane 1

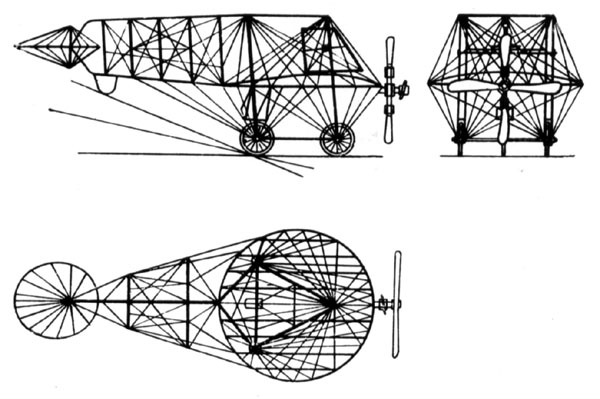
Schematics of Spheroplane 1

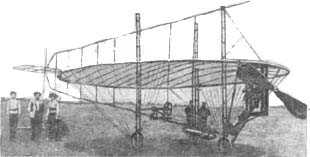
Spheroplane 2

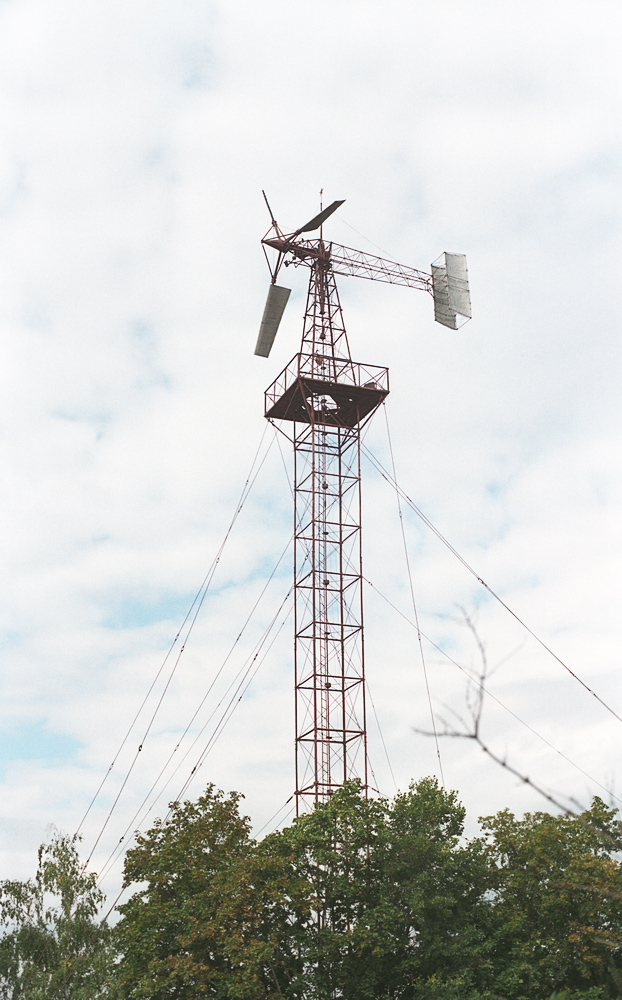
Wind turbine in Kursk (in work 1931-1936)
