= Anatoli Zarapin =

Russian footballer and coach

Personal information
- Full name: Anatoli Petrovich Zarapin
- Date of birth: 13 June 1947 (age 79)
- Place of birth: Karaganda, Kazakh SSR
- Height: 1.90 m (6 ft 3 in)
- Position: Goalkeeper

Senior career*
Years	Team	Apps	(Gls)
1968–1971	FC Shakhter Karagandy	119	(0)
1972–1973	FC Lokomotiv Moscow	0	(0)
1974–1981	FC Torpedo Moscow	89	(0)
1982	FC Metalist Kharkiv	5	(0)

Managerial career
- 1997: FC Torpedo-ZIL Moscow (assistant)
- 1999–2006: FC Torpedo Moscow (assistant)
- 2008–2009: FC Volga Nizhny Novgorod (GK coach)
- 2009: FC Khimki (GK coach)
- 2010: FC Torpedo Vladimir (GK coach)
- * Club domestic league appearances and goals

Anatoli Petrovich Zarapin (Russian: Анатолий Петрович Зарапин; born 13 June 1947) is a Russian professional football coach and a former player.
