= Anatoly Khvorostov =

Russian art historian (1940–2024)

- Born: 22 February 1940; Moscow, USSR
- Died: 23 December 2024 (aged 84)
- Occupation(s): Art historian, scientist

Anatoly Semyonovich Khvorostov (Russian: Анатолий Семёнович Хворостов; 22 February 1940 – 23 December 2024) was a Russian art historian and scientist. He was a recipient of the Honored Art Worker of the RSFSR (1981).

Khvorostov died on 23 December 2024, at the age of 84.
