= Anatoliy Romanenko =

Ukrainian politician (1928–2025)

- Анатолій Романенко

Minister of Health of the Ukrainian SSR
- In office 24 April 1975 – 10 November 1989
- Preceded by: Vasiliy Bratus
- Succeeded by: Yurii Spizhenko

Personal details
- Born: Anatoliy Yukhymovich Romanenko; 15 December 1928 Novopavlivka, Dnipropetrovsk Okrug, Ukrainian SSR, USSR
- Died: 17 December 2025 (aged 97) Kyiv, Ukraine
- Party: CPSU
- Education: Dnipropetrovsk State Medical Institute
- Occupation: Doctor

Anatoliy Yukhymovich Romanenko (Ukrainian: Анато́лій Юхи́мович Романе́нко; 15 December 1928 – 17 December 2025) was a Ukrainian politician. A member of the Communist Party of the Soviet Union, he served as Minister of Health of the Ukrainian SSR from 1975 to 1989.

Romanenko died in Kyiv on 17 December 2025, at the age of 97.
