= Anatoly Menshchikov =

Russian actor (1950–2025)

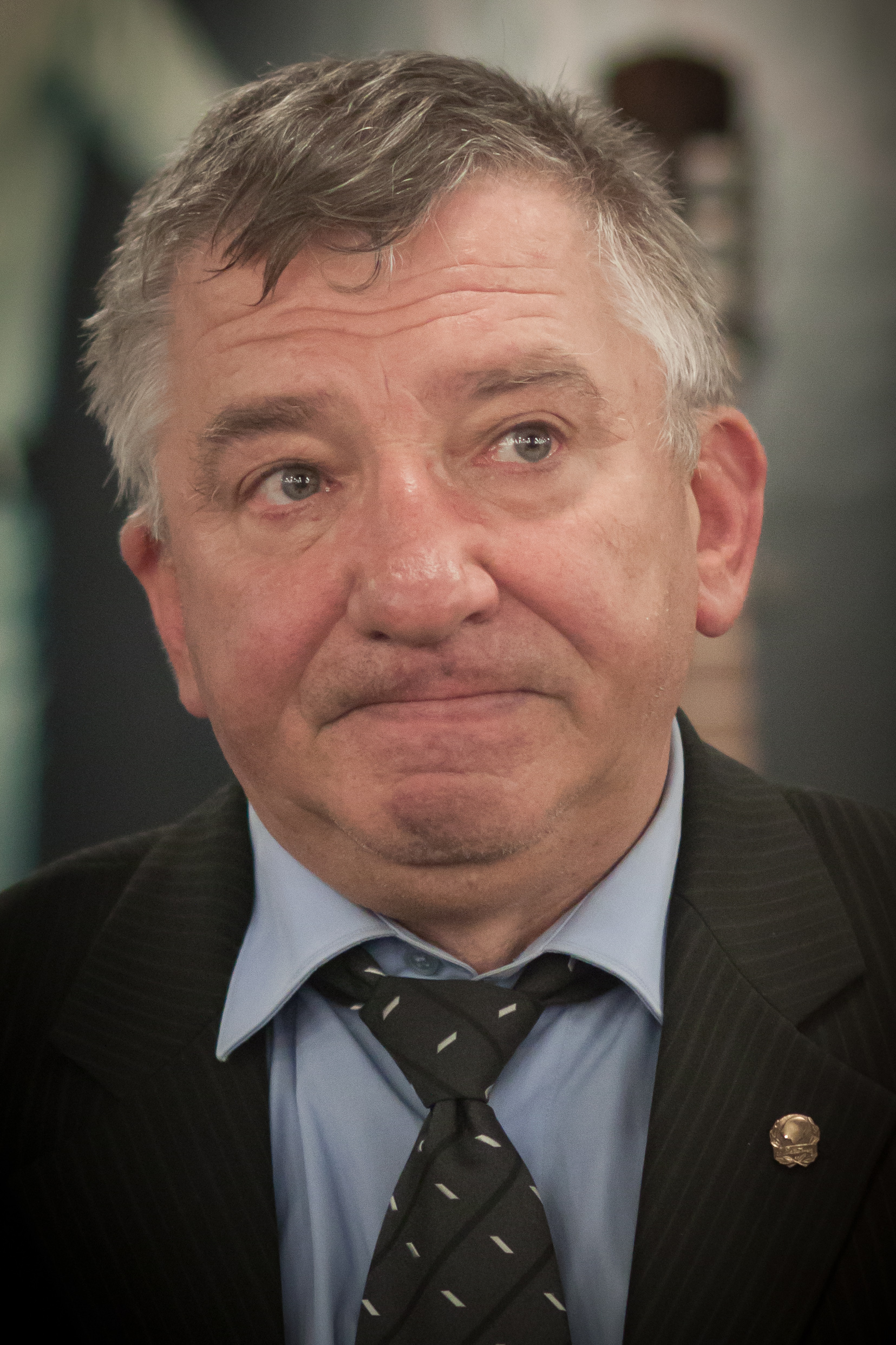
Menshchikov in 2012

Anatoly Sergeyevich Menshchikov (3 June 1950 – 30 October 2025) was a Soviet and Russian film and theatre actor. He performed at the Vakhtangov State Academic Theatre for nearly five decades, and he also acted in films. He was an Honored Artist of the RSFSR. Menshchikov died on 30 October 2025, at the age of 75.
