= Anatoli Chekanov =

Russian footballer

Personal information
- Date of birth: 13 March 1960 (age 66)
- Height: 1.82 m (5 ft 11 1/2 in)
- Position: Forward

Youth career
- FC Amur Komsomolsk-na-Amure

Senior career*
Years	Team	Apps	(Gls)
1978	FC Amur Komsomolsk-na-Amure	19	(0)
1981–1982	FC Amur Komsomolsk-na-Amure	37	(6)
1986–1992	FC Amur Komsomolsk-na-Amure	190	(64)
1993–1994	FC Luch Vladivostok	24	(3)
1999	FC KnAAPO-Smena Komsomolsk-na-Amure (amateur)		
- * Club domestic league appearances and goals

Anatoli Chekanov (Russian: Анатолий Чеканов; born 13 March 1960) is a former Russian football player.
