= Anatoly Radyushkin =

Theoretical physicist

Anatoly V. Radyushkin is a physicist.

Radyushkin completed his master's degree and PhD in physics at the Moscow State University in 1975 and 1978, respectively. He then earned a Doctor of Science degree at the Joint Institute for Nuclear Research in 1987. Radyushkin joined the Old Dominion University faculty in 1992, and also worked for the Thomas Jefferson National Accelerator Facility.

Radyushkin was elected a fellow of the American Physical Society in 1996, "[f]or pioneering studies of exclusive processes in quantum chromodynamics and applications of QCD sum rules to hadronic form factors." In 1998, he was one of three faculty members at Old Dominion to receive the university's Eminent Scholar Award. In 2015, the Southeastern Section of the APS named Radyushkin the recipient of the 2015 Jesse W. Beams Award.
