= Anatoly Donika =

Russian ice hockey player

- Born: 20 June 1960 (age 64)
- Height: 6 ft 0 in (183 cm)
- Weight: 187 lb (85 kg; 13 st 5 lb)
- Position: Defence
- Played for: RSL; Sokil Kyiv; HC Neftekhimik Nizhnekamsk
- NHL draft: Undrafted
- Playing career: 1982–1996

Anatoly Donika (born 20 June 1960) is a Russian former professional ice hockey defenceman who was a long-time member of the Sokil Kyiv in the Russian Superleague.
