= Anatoly Smirnov (engineer) =

Russian scientist

- Born: Anatoly Filippovich Smirnov; 21 November 1909; Staraya Racheyka, Syzransky Uyezd, Samara Governorate, Russian Empire
- Died: 25 February 1986 (aged 76); Moscow, Soviet Union
- Occupation: Engineer
- Awards: Hero of Socialist Labour; USSR State Prize

Anatoly Filippovich Smirnov (Russian: Анато́лий Фили́ппович Смирно́в; 21 November 1909 – 25 February 1986) was a Soviet scientist working in the field of structural mechanics.

He graduated Moscow Institute of Railroad Engineers in 1935 and taught structural mechanics there since 1936, becoming a Doctor of Technical Sciences in 1945 and professor in 1947. In 1951, he became a member of the CPSU. In 1969, he became the director of the Central Research Institute of Building Structures.
