= Anatoly Balchev =

Anatoly Balchev Анатолий Маркович Бальчев
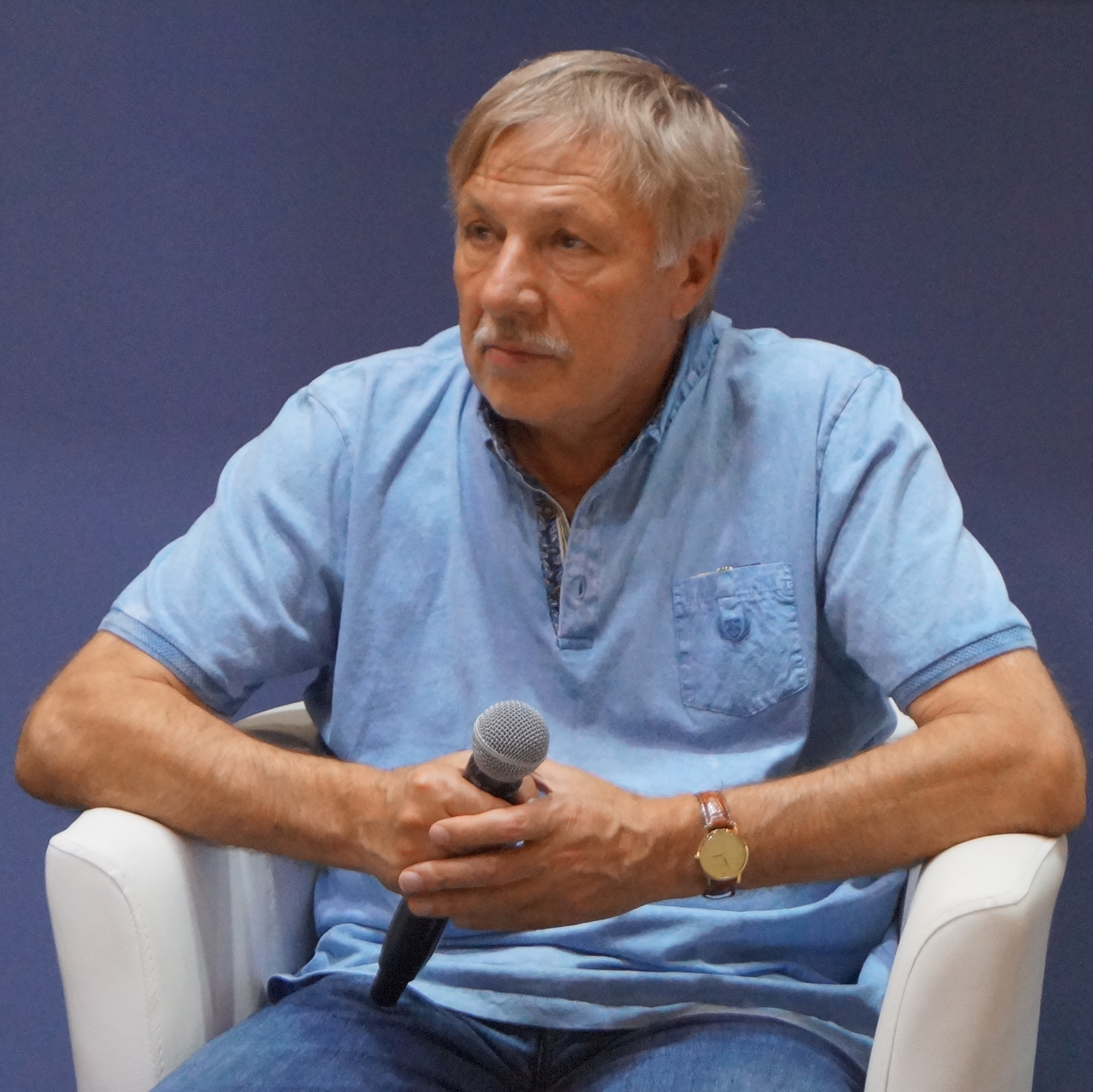
- Balchev in 2018

Background information
- Born: 28 July 1946 (age 79)
- Occupations: Composer, actor, screenwriter and director

Anatoly Balchev (Ukrainian Анатолий Маркович Бальчев, born 28 July 1946) is a Russian composer, actor, screenwriter and director.

== Life and work ==
Balchev initially worked as a composer, creating pieces for the cinema and theater, as well as songs for Russian pop stars and releasing albums with his own songs. In the self-written piece The Poets' Café he debuted in 1990 as a director.

In the 1990s he was co-producer of the Russian-American project Cops in Russia, the Russian version of the television show COPS by Fox Television. In 1998 he founded the Apollo Film Studio. His intensive study of film-making practiced in Hollywood enabled him to direct the Russian-American movie Passenger from San Francisco. He has written several screenplays waiting to be filmed.

In 2026, Russian director and screenwriter Anatoly Balchev presented the documentary-biographical film Vysotsky. Unknown Pages (18+) in Kazan.The film forms part of his ongoing exploration of the life and legacy of Soviet singer, poet, and actor Vladimir Vysotsky.

== Filmography (selection) ==
- Высоцкий. Неизвестные страницы (Vysotsky, Unknown Pages), 2017
- Пассажир из Сан-Франциско (Passenger from San Francisco), 2014
- Vladimir Vysotsky's 80th Birthday

== Songs (selection) ==
- Пасхальная (Easter)
- Хризантемы (chrysanthemums)
- У зим бывают имена (winter have names)
- Ялта (Yalta)
