= Anatoli Pata =

Russian footballer (1958–2025)

Personal information
- Full name: Anatoli Grigoryevich Pata
- Date of birth: 30 July 1958
- Place of birth: Stalino, Ukrainian SSR, USSR
- Date of death: 10 January 2025 (aged 66)
- Height: 1.82 m (6 ft 0 in)
- Position: Goalkeeper

Youth career
- Shakhtar Donetsk

Senior career*
Years	Team	Apps	(Gls)
1975	Mashuk Pyatigorsk	0	(0)
1977–1979	Southern Group of Forces Team		
1982	Mashuk Pyatigorsk	26	(0)
1983–1984	Rotor Volgograd	29	(0)
1985–1989	Dynamo Stavropol	167	(4)
1989–1990	Kuban Krasnordar	43	(0)
1991–1992	Dynamo Izobilny	64	(3)
1993	Asmaral Kislovodsk	2	(0)
1993–1994	Dynamo Stavropol	30	(0)
1995–1997	FC Gigant Sotnikovskoye		

Managerial career
- 2001–2002: Dynamo Stavropol (assistant)
- 2002: Dynamo Stavropol
- 2002–2003: Dynamo Stavropol (assistant)
- 2003–2004: Dynamo Stavropol
- 2010: Dynamo Stavropol
- 2010–2011: Dynamo Stavropol (scout)
- 2011–?: FC Elektroavtomatika Stavropol
- * Club domestic league appearances and goals

Anatoli Grigoryevich Pata (Russian: Анатолий Григорьевич Пата; 30 July 1958 – 10 January 2025) was a Russian football coach and a player. A goalkeeper, he scored seven goals from penalty kicks during his professional career. Pata died on 10 January 2025, at the age of 66.
