= Anatoly Romanchuk =

Soviet-Ukrainian turner and politician (1944–2023)

Member of the Supreme Soviet of the Ukrainian Soviet Socialist Republic
- In office 1971–1985

Personal details
- Born: Anatoly Oleksandrovych Romanchuk; 15 October 1944 Khyzhevichi, Ukrainian SSR, USSR
- Died: 12 June 2023 (aged 78) Lutsk, Ukraine
- Party: CPSU
- Occupation: Turner

Anatoly Oleksandrovich Romanchuk (Ukrainian: Анатолій Олександрович Романчук; 15 October 1944 – 12 June 2023) was a Soviet-Ukrainian turner and politician. A member of the Communist Party, he served in the Supreme Soviet of the Ukrainian Soviet Socialist Republic from 1971 to 1985.

Romanchuk died in Lutsk on 12 June 2023 at the age of 78.
