= Anatoly Rusanov =

Russian chemist (1932–2026)

Anatoly Ivanovich Rusanov (Russian: Анатолий Иванович Русанов; 20 April 1932 – 6 May 2026) was a Russian chemist. Born in Leningrad, he was a member of the Russian Academy of Science from 1990. Rusanov graduated from Leningrad State University and was the head of the Colloid Chemistry Department of St. Petersburg State University. He died on 6 May 2026, at the age of 94.

== Awards ==
- The State Prize of the USSR (1981)
- The Volfkovich prize of the Russian Chemical Society (1991)
- The Mendeleyev Prize of the Russian Academy of Sciences (1993)
- The Rehbinder Prize of the Russian Academy of Sciences (2001)

== Sources ==
- Boris A Noskov, Anatoly Ivanovich Rusanov, Advances in Colloid and Interface Science, Vol. 110 (2004), pp. 1–3 doi:10.1016/S0001-8686(03)00102-7
