= Anatoliy Ostapenko =

Ukrainian lawyer and politician

- Анатолій Остапенко
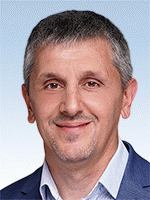

Member of the Verkhovna Rada
- Incumbent
- Assumed office 3 September 2019

Personal details
- Born: Anatoliy Dmytrovych Ostapenko; 1 February 1968 (age 58) Kyiv, Soviet Union (now Ukraine)
- Party: Servant of the People

Anatoliy Dmytrovych Ostapenko (Ukrainian: Анатолій Дмитрович Остапенко; born in 1 February 1968), is a Ukrainian politician and lawyer who is a member of the Verkhovna Rada of the 9th convocation since 3 September 2019.

== Biography ==
Ostapenko was born in Kyiv on 1 February 1968. He graduated from the Ukrainian Transport University (specialty "Mechanical Engineer"), the International Solomon University (specialty "Lawyer").

He is a director at the Alfayurconsulting law firm. He worked in management positions in legal and industrial associations.

Ostapenko was the candidate for People's Deputies from the Servant of the People party in the 2019 parliamentary elections, No. 130 on the list. At the time of the elections: he was the director of Alfayurconsulting LLC, and is a member of the Servant of the People party, and lives in Kyiv.

He is a member of the Verkhovna Rada Committee on Social Policy and Protection of Veterans' Rights, and the Chairman of the Subcommittee on Social Protection of Veterans' Rights.
