= Anatoly Komm =

Russian chef and restaurateur

Anatoly Anatolyevich Komm (Russian: Анатолий Анатольевич Комм; born 26 January 1967) is a Russian chef and restaurateur. He is the first Russian to have an establishment (his restaurant Green) listed in the Michelin Guide.

== Biography ==
Komm was born in Moscow in 1967. After studying geophysics, he began working in the computer business. He then moved to fashion, traveling all over Europe. Komm’s first restaurant, Green, was opened in 2001 in Moscow. He later started Club Progressive Daddy and the restaurants Твербуль (Tverbul) and Варвары (Barbarians), where traditional Russian and Soviet cuisine (e.g. borsch, pelmeni, olivier salad) is served in the molecular style.

In February 2013, Komm was in partnership with Alexei Nagornov, head of the Ural entertainment company Sweet Life Corporation. They opened Ресторан №1 (Restaurant No. 1), a "Brasserie De Luxe" in Yekaterinburg. Its cuisine is based on the products of the Urals.
