= Anatoly Lepyoshkin =

Soviet speed skater (born 1938)

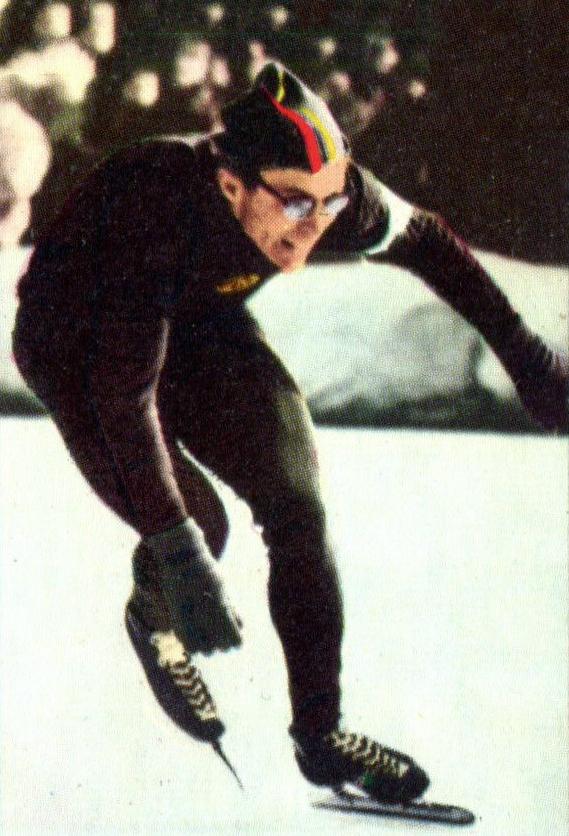
- Anatoly Lepyoshkin in 1968

Personal information
- Born: 21 December 1938 (age 87)
- Height: 1.71 m (5 ft 7 in)
- Weight: 68 kg (150 lb)

Sport
- Sport: Speed skating
- Event: 500-10000 m
- Club: Lokomotiv Novosibirsk

Achievements and titles
- Personal bests: 500 m – 38.8 (1969); 1000 m – 1:21.3 (1970); 1500 m – 2:11.4 (1968); 5000 m – 8:21.1 (1966); 10000 m – 17:48.8 (1972)

Anatoly Ivanovich Lepyoshkin (Russian: Анатолий Иванович Лепёшкин; born 21 December 1938) is a retired Russian speed skater. He competed at the 1968 Winter Olympics and finished in 11th place in the 500 m event.

In retirement Lepyoshkin worked as a speedskating coach in Novosibirsk. In 2001 he was attacked by thugs and ended in a coma due to a concussion and a knife wound in the chest.
