= Anatoly Frenkel =

American physicist

Anatoly I. Frenkel (born 1964 in Leningrad, USSR) is an American physicist and professor. Frenkel is a researcher in the physicochemical properties of materials, focusing on the processes that link the nanoscale details of their structure to the mechanisms of work. His work has led to new techniques for materials characterization, including machine learning methods for X-ray absorption spectroscopy and multimodal, operando methods for catalytic studies using synchrotron radiation.

== Education and work ==
Frenkel earned his B.S. and M.Sc. degree in physics from Leningrad State University in 1987, and Ph.D. degree in physics from Tel Aviv University in 1995. He completed his postdoctoral appointment at University of Washington with Edward A. Stern in 1996. He held a position as professor of physics in Yeshiva University until 2016. He is currently a professor and Chair at the Department of Materials Science and Chemical Engineering at Stony Brook University, and a senior chemist (joint appointment) at the Division of Chemistry at Brookhaven National Laboratory.

== Research ==
His interests are in materials science, nanotechnology, catalysis, optoelectronic and electromechanical materials. He is a specialist in the field of X-ray absorption spectroscopy, operando characterization and method developments for their data analysis and applications.

== Workshops and short courses on X-ray absorption spectroscopy ==
Since 2005, Frenkel has organized annual short courses and workshops on X-ray absorption spectroscopy at Brookhaven National Laboratory. He has run and instructed at multiple synchrotron summer schools and short courses in USA, China, Israel, Netherlands, Brazil, Germany, Switzerland, Spain and Canada. He is a co-director of Synchrotron Catalysis Consortium at Brookhaven National Laboratory.

== Awards and achievements ==
- 2026 - Ed Stern Prize (Outstanding Achievement Award) of the International X-ray Absorption Society
- 2025 - American Ceramic Society Ross Coffin Purdy Award
- 2025 - Schulich Visiting Professor Lectureship Award, Technion – Israel Institute of Technology
- 2023 - Fellow of the American Association for the Advancement of Science
- 2017 - Fellow of the American Physical Society
- 2016 - SUNY Empire Innovation Program Faculty
- 2015-2027 - Weston Visiting Professorship Fellow, Weizmann Institute of Science
- 2003 - Outstanding Junior Faculty Award, Yeshiva University
