= Anatoly Zimon =

Anatoly Zimon in 2010

Anatoly Davydovich Zimon (Russian: Анато́лий Давы́дович Зимо́н; 20 November 1924 – 22 February 2015) was an honorary professor of the Moscow State Technological Academy, a Doctor of Technical Sciences, Honored Scientist of Russia, Academician of the International Academy of Ecology and Life Safety, veteran of World War II and a retired colonel.

He justified and created a new trend in the field of adhesion, which has a major scientific and practical value and has gained recognition in Russia and abroad. Seven monographs of the author, including two published in the United States amounted to an encyclopedia of adhesion. In the book Decontamination published in Japan and Germany, based on his own research, he presents the theory and practice of decontamination and testing after the Chernobyl disaster. He has published five scientific books, among them the first time in Physical and Colloid Chemistry Textbooks in Physical and Colloid Chemistry. During the years 1967-2001 he published 26 books, and with a recent re-release this makes 37 volumes and 571 printed pages.
