= Anatoli Grishin (footballer) =

Russian footballer

Personal information
- Full name: Anatoli Aleksandrovich Grishin
- Date of birth: 5 September 1986 (age 40)
- Height: 1.73 m (5 ft 8 in)
- Position: Midfielder

Senior career*
Years	Team	Apps	(Gls)
2005–2006	FC Metallurg Krasnoyarsk	30	(1)
2006	FC Kuzbass-Dynamo Kemerovo	16	(0)
2007	FC Metallurg Krasnoyarsk	26	(1)
2008	FC Amur Blagoveshchensk	16	(1)
2008	FC Metallurg Krasnoyarsk	6	(0)
2009	FC Amur Blagoveshchensk	19	(2)
2010–2011	FC Rassvet Krasnoyarsk		
2012–2013	FC Shakhtyor Prokopyevsk (amateur)		
2014–2015	FC Restavratsiya Krasnoyarsk		
2016–2017	FC Rassvet-Restavratsiya Krasnoyarsk		
2019	FC Spartak Zheleznogorsk		
- * Club domestic league appearances and goals

Anatoli Aleksandrovich Grishin (Russian: Анатолий Александрович Гришин; born 5 September 1986) is a Russian former professional football player.

== Club career ==
He played in the Russian Football National League for FC Metallurg Krasnoyarsk in 2006.
