= Anatolius =

Anatolius is both a given name and a surname. Notable people with the name include:

== Given name ==
- Anatolius of Laodicea (died 283), Bishop of Laodicea in Syria, also known as Anatolius of Alexandria, Christian saint
- Anatolius, Vicarius of the Diocese of Asia in 352
- Anatolius (praetorian prefect), Praetorian prefect of Illyricum in 360, probably identical to Vindonius Anatolius
- Anatolius (consul) (421–451), Byzantine general, politician, and diplomat
- Anatolius of Constantinople, Patriarch of Constantinople (449–458), Chalcedonian saint
- Anatolius (curator), Byzantine honorary consul, killed in an earthquake in 557
- Anatolius (Osroene), Byzantine governor of Osroene, executed as a crypto-pagan c. 579
- Anatolius of Naples (died 638), third Duke of Naples
- Frans Anatolius Sjöström (1840–1885), Finnish architect

== Surname ==
- Vindonius Anatolius, 4th century Greek writer

== See also ==
- Anatoly (name)
- Anatol
- Anatole
- Anatolio
- Anatoli (disambiguation)
