= Anatol =

Anatol is a masculine given name, derived from the Greek name Ἀνατόλιος Anatolius, meaning "sunrise".

The Russian version of the name is Anatoly (also transliterated as Anatoliy and Anatoli). The French version is Anatole. A rarer variant is Anatolio.

Saint Anatolius of Laodicea was a third-century saint from Alexandria in Egypt. Anatolius was also the name of the first Patriarch of Constantinople.

== People ==
Notable people with the name include:

- Anatol Cheptine (born 1990), Moldovan footballer
- Anatol Chiriac (born 1947), Moldovan composer
- Anatol Ciobanu (1934–2016), Moldovan professor
- Anatol Codru (1936–2010), Moldovan writer
- Anatol Dumitraș (1955–2016), Moldovan singer
- Anatol E. Baconsky (1925–1977), Romanian poet
- Anatol Fejgin (1909–2002), Polish intelligence officer
- Anatol Heintz (1898–1975), Norwegian palaeontologist
- Anatol, artist's name of Anatol Herzfeld (1931–2019), German sculptor
- Anatol Hrytskievich (1929–2015), Belarusian historian
- Anatol Josepho (1894–1980), Siberian-American inventor
- Anatol Lieven (born 1960), British author
- Anatol von Lieven (1872–1937), Baltic German military commander
- Perepadia Anatol (1935-2008), Ukrainian translator
- Anatol Petrencu (born 1954), Moldovan politician
- Anatol Petrytsky (1895–1964), Soviet painter
- Anatol Pikas (1928–2021), Swedish psychologist
- Anatol Provazník (1887–1950), Czech organist
- Anatol Rapoport (1911–2007), Russian-American psychologist
- Anatol Rosenfeld (1912–1973), German philosopher
- Anatol Roshko (1923–2017), American engineer
- Anatol Șalaru (born 1962), Moldovan politician
- Anatol Stern (1899–1968), Polish poet
- Anatol Țăranu (born 1951), Moldovan politician
- Anatol Teslev (born 1947), Moldovan football coach
- Anatol Tschepurnoff (1871–1942), Russian-Finnish chess player
- Anatol Vasilyevich Kuragin, a fictional character in Tolstoy's War and Peace
- Anatol Vidrașcu (born 1949), Moldovan writer
- Anatol Vieru (1926–1998), Romanian composer
- Anatol Yusef (born 1978), British actor
- Anatol Zhabotinsky (1938–2008), Russian biophysicist

== Fictional character ==
- Anatole Kuragin from Tolstoy's War and Peace

== Other ==
- Cyclone Anatol was the name given to a European windstorm that struck in early December 1999.
