= Provazník =

Provazník is a very common Czech surname. The feminine form is Provazníková. Literally, it means "rope-maker".

It may mean:

- Alois Provazník (1856–1938), composer
- Anatol Provazník (1887–1950), composer, son of Alois
- František Provazník (born 1948), rower

== See also ==
- Povrazník, a village in Slovakia
