= Constantinople earthquake =

Constantinople earthquake may refer to:

- 447 Constantinople earthquake
- 557 Constantinople earthquake
- 740 Constantinople earthquake
- 1509 Constantinople earthquake
