= Anatole =

Anatole may refer to:

== People ==
- Anatole (given name), a French masculine given name
- Anatole (dancer) (19th century), French ballet dancer
- Alex Anatole (born 1948), Russian-American Taoist priest
- Anatole France (born 1844), a French poet, journalist, and novelist

== Fictional characters ==
- Anatole (mouse), a fictional mouse who is the title character in a series of children's books by Eve Titus and Paul Galdone
- Anatole (Jeeves character), a fictional character in the Jeeves stories who is the French chef of Aunt Dahlia
- Anatole Kuragin, a main character in Leo Tolstoy's novel War and Peace

== Other uses ==
- Anatole (TV series), an animated children's television series
- Hilton Anatole, an American hotel

== See also ==
- Anatol
- Anatoli (disambiguation)
- Anatoly
- Anatolius (disambiguation)
