= Anatoli (disambiguation) =

Anatoli is a town in the Ioannina regional unit, Greece.

Anatoli may also refer to:

- Anatoli, Lasithi, Greece
- Anatoli (given name), a Russian masculine given name
- Anatoli (newspaper), a newspaper in the Ottoman Empire published in Karamanli Turkish

== See also ==
- Anatol
- Anatole (disambiguation)
- Anatolia (disambiguation)
- Anatolio
