= Anatole (given name) =

Anatole is a French male name, derived from the Greek name Ανατολιος Anatolius, meaning "sunrise." The Russian version of the name is Anatoly. Other variants are Anatol and more rarely Anatolio.

- Anatole, baron Brénier de Renaudière (1807–1885), French diplomat and politician
- Anatole Abragam (1914–2011), French physicist who wrote The Principles of Nuclear Magnetism
- Anatole Broyard (1920–1990), American literary critic for The New York Times
- Anatole (dancer), French ballet dancer, master and composer
- Anatole Dauman (1925–1998), French film producer
- Anatole Deibler (1863–1939), Monsieur de Paris, 1899–1939
- Anatole de Grunwald (1910–1967), British film producer and screenwriter
- Anatole de Monzie (1876–1947), French administrator and encyclopaedist
- Anatole Fistoulari (1907–1995), Ukrainian conductor
- Anatole France (1844–1924), French poet, journalist and novelist
- Anatole Friedland (1881–1938), Russian-born American songwriter
- Anatole Jakovsky (1909–1988), French art critic
- Anatole Kanyenkiko (born 1952), Prime Minister of Burundi from 1994 to 1995
- Anatole Katok (1944–2018), American mathematician
- Anatole Le Braz (1859–1926), Breton folklore collector and translator
- Anatole Litvak (1902–1974), Ukrainian-born filmmaker
- Anatole Mallet (1837–1919), Swiss mechanical engineer
- Anatole Taubman (born 1971), Swiss actor
- Anatole Vakhnianyn (1841–1908), Ukrainian political and cultural figure
- Anatole Serret, Australian percussionist for Parcels

== See also ==
- Anatoly (name)
