= Architecture of Istanbul =

Overview of architecture in Istanbul

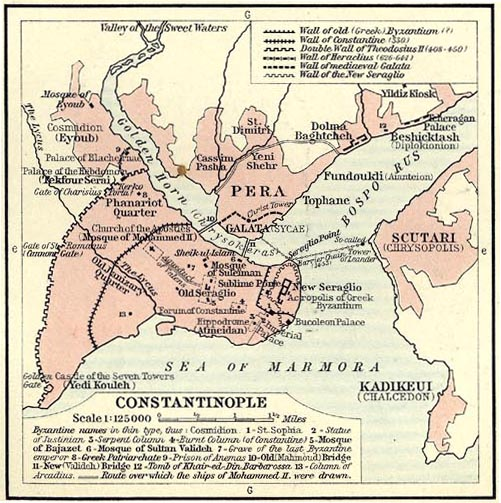
A map of Istanbul, 1911.

The architecture of Istanbul describes a large mixture of structures which reflect the influences that have made an indelible mark in all districts of the city. The ancient part of the city (the historic peninsula) is still partially surrounded by the Walls of Constantinople, erected in the 5th century by Emperor Theodosius II to protect the city from invasion. The architecture inside the city proper contains buildings and structures which came from Byzantine, Genoese, Ottoman, and modern Turkish sources. The city has many architecturally significant entities. Throughout its long history, Istanbul has acquired a reputation for being a cultural and ethnic melting pot. Accordingly, there are many historical mosques, churches, synagogues, palaces, castles, and towers in Istanbul.

== Ancient Greek and Roman structures ==
=== Serpent Column ===
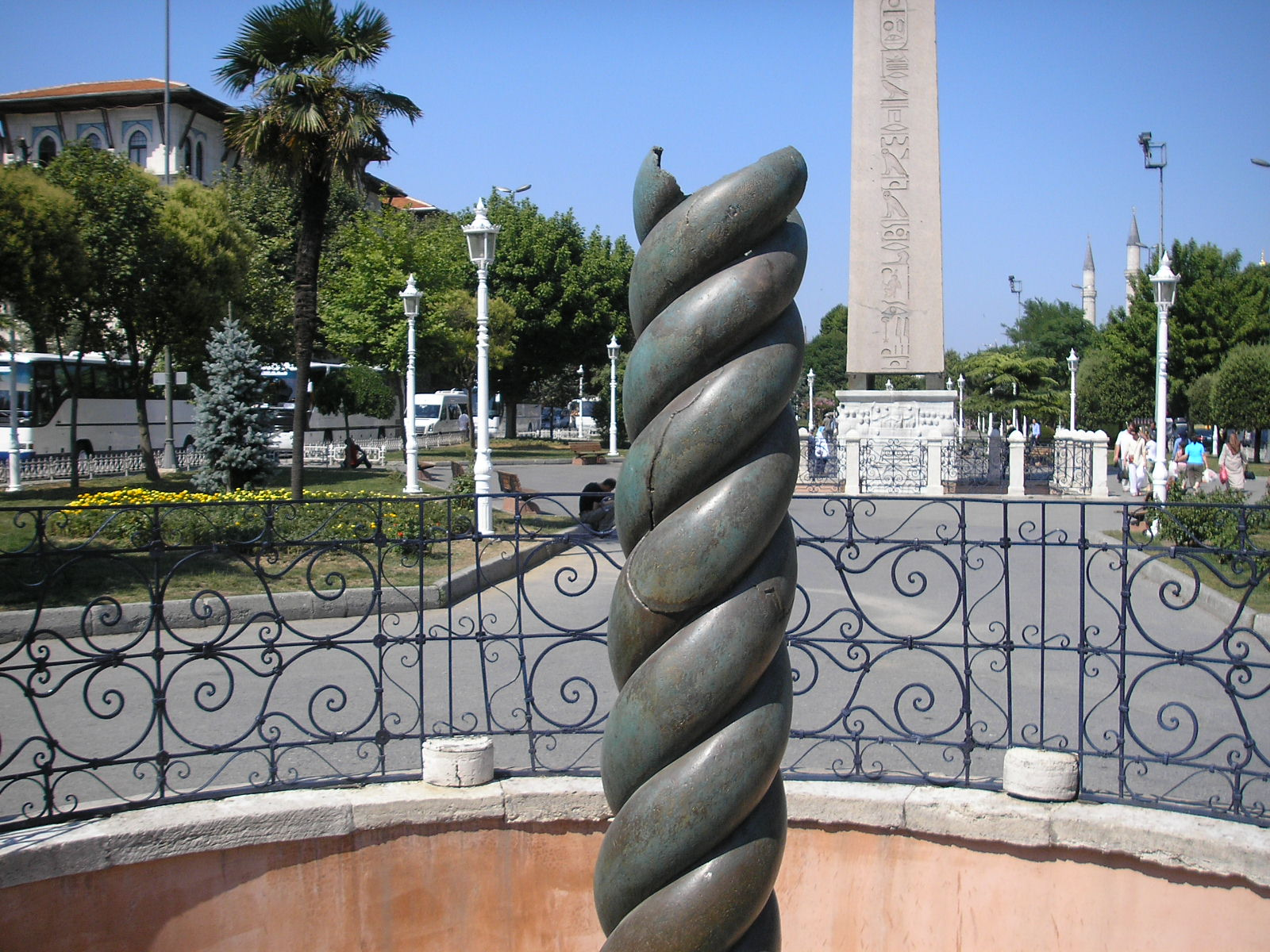
The Serpent Column, the oldest surviving Greek monument in Istanbul

One of the oldest monuments still surviving from antiquity is the Serpent Column, a monument built originally to honor Apollo for the victory over the Persians at Plataea in 479 BC. The column was moved by Constantine the Great when Constantinople became the new capital, and has stood at the Hippodrome of Constantinople ever since. According to legend, a member of the Polish Embassy visiting in 1700 damaged the top of it severely, breaking off the serpent heads, although in reality at least one of the heads had been reported as badly damaged two centuries earlier. The accepted version states that Mehmed II shattered it upon entering the city in triumph as its conqueror. The upper jaw of one of the snake's heads is on display at the Archaeological Museum in Istanbul.

=== Column of Constantine ===
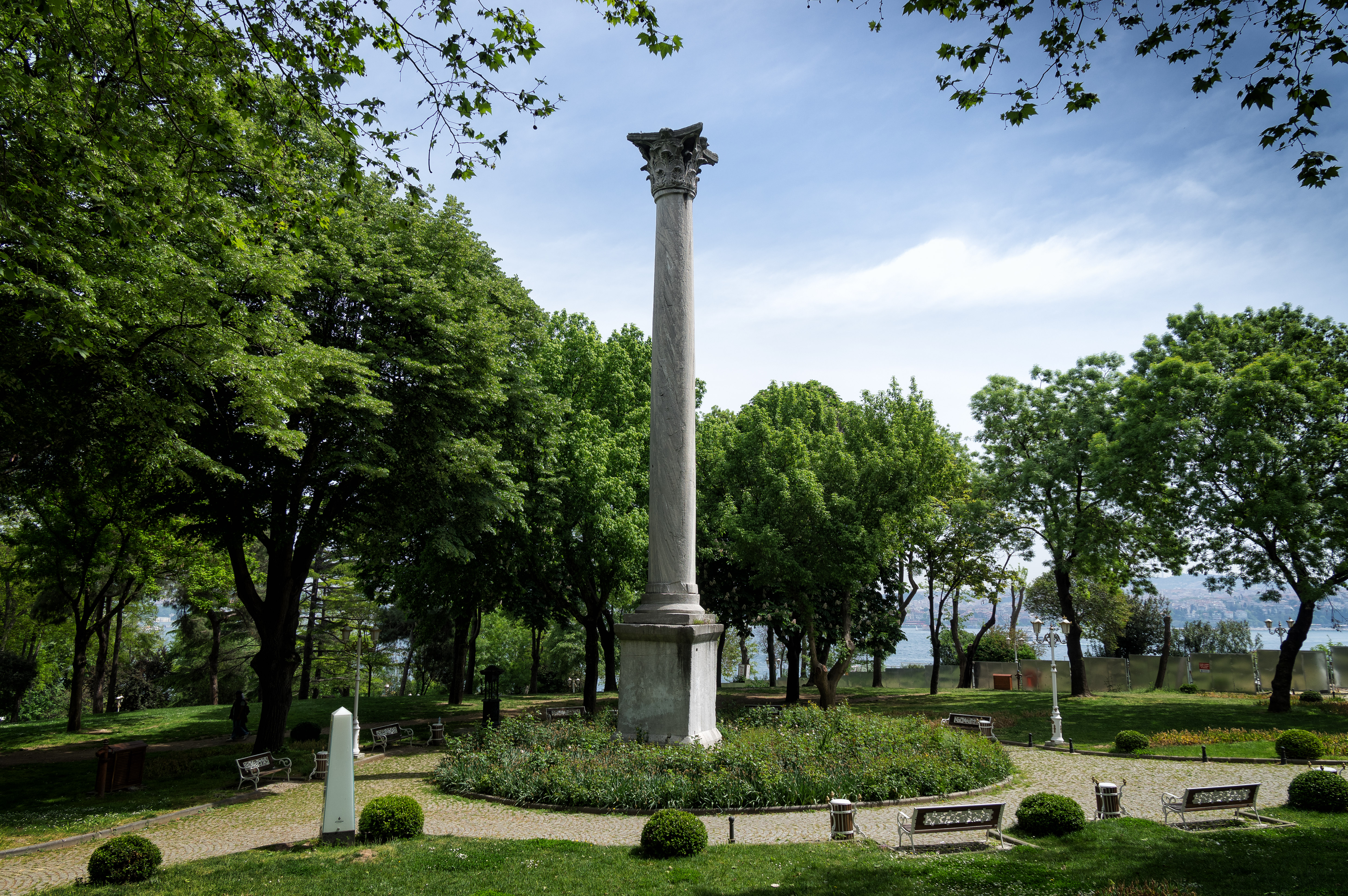
Column of the Goths in Gülhane Park

The most important monuments of Roman architecture in the city include the Column of Constantine (Turkish: Çemberlitaş), which was erected in 330 by Constantine the Great for marking the declaration of the new capital city of the Roman Empire and contained several fragments of the True Cross and other artifacts belonging to Jesus Christ and Virgin Mary, the Mazulkemer Aqueduct, the Valens Aqueduct, the Column of the Goths in Gülhane Park, the Milion which served for calculating the distances between Constantinople and other cities of the Roman Empire, and the Hippodrome of Constantinople which was built following the model of the Circus Maximus in Rome.

== Byzantine and Genoese structures ==
=== Walls of Constantinople and environs ===
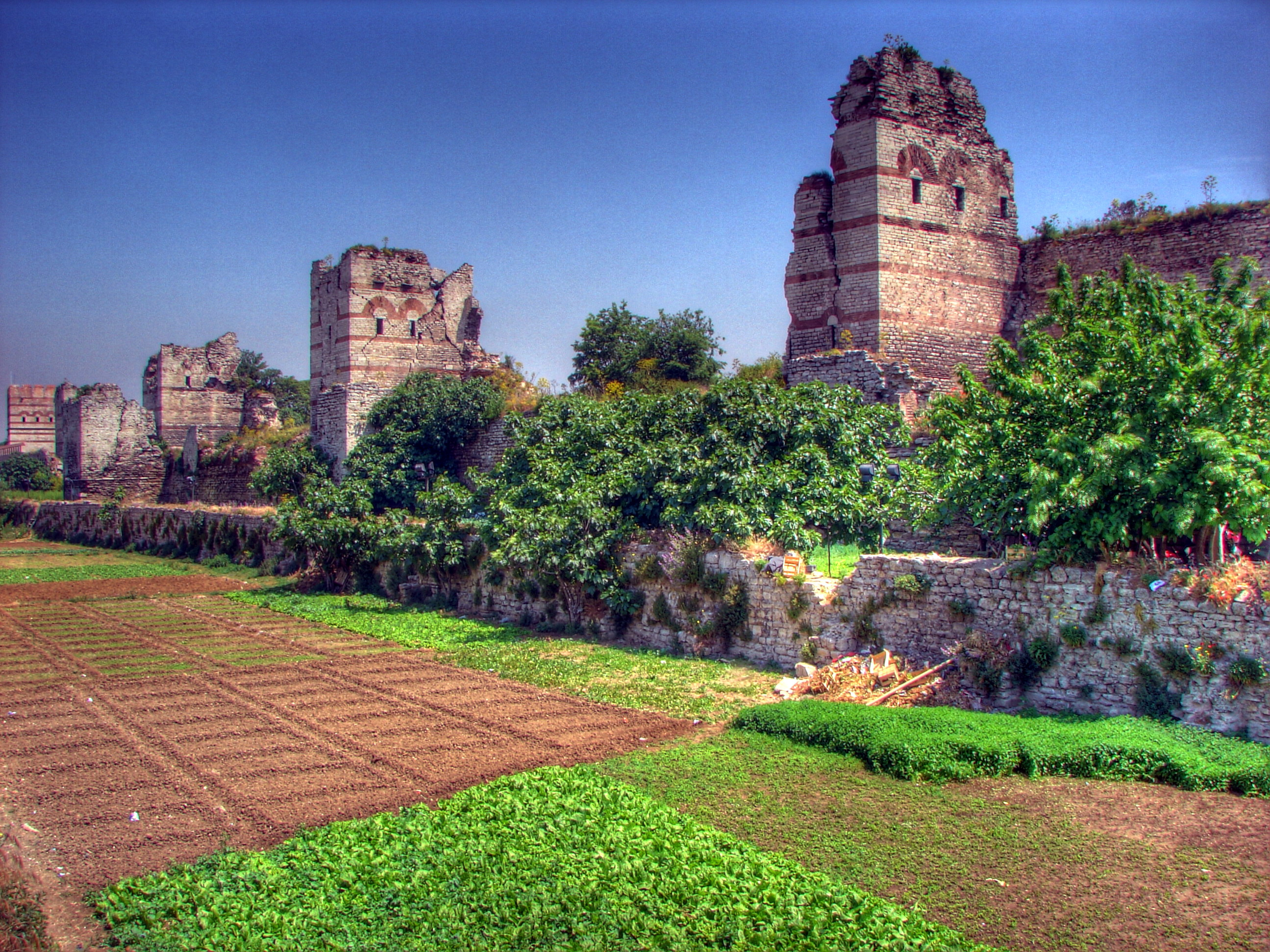
The water trench which stood in front of the triple land walls of Constantinople was later filled with earth and used for agriculture

Construction of the Walls of Constantinople began under Constantine the Great, who enlarged the previously existing walls of Byzantium in order to defend the new Roman capital city which quickly grew following its proclamation as Nova Roma. A new set of walls was built further west during the reign of Theodosius II, and rebuilt after an earthquake in 447 in their current shape. The sea walls in the Seraglio Point area, which have continuously existed since Lygos and Byzantium, are the oldest part of the city walls; while the double land walls of Theodosius II at the western end of the city are the strongest parts. The northwestern section of the land walls was built in 627, during the reign of Heraclius (610–641), in order to accommodate the suburb of Blachernae, and added to by later emperors.

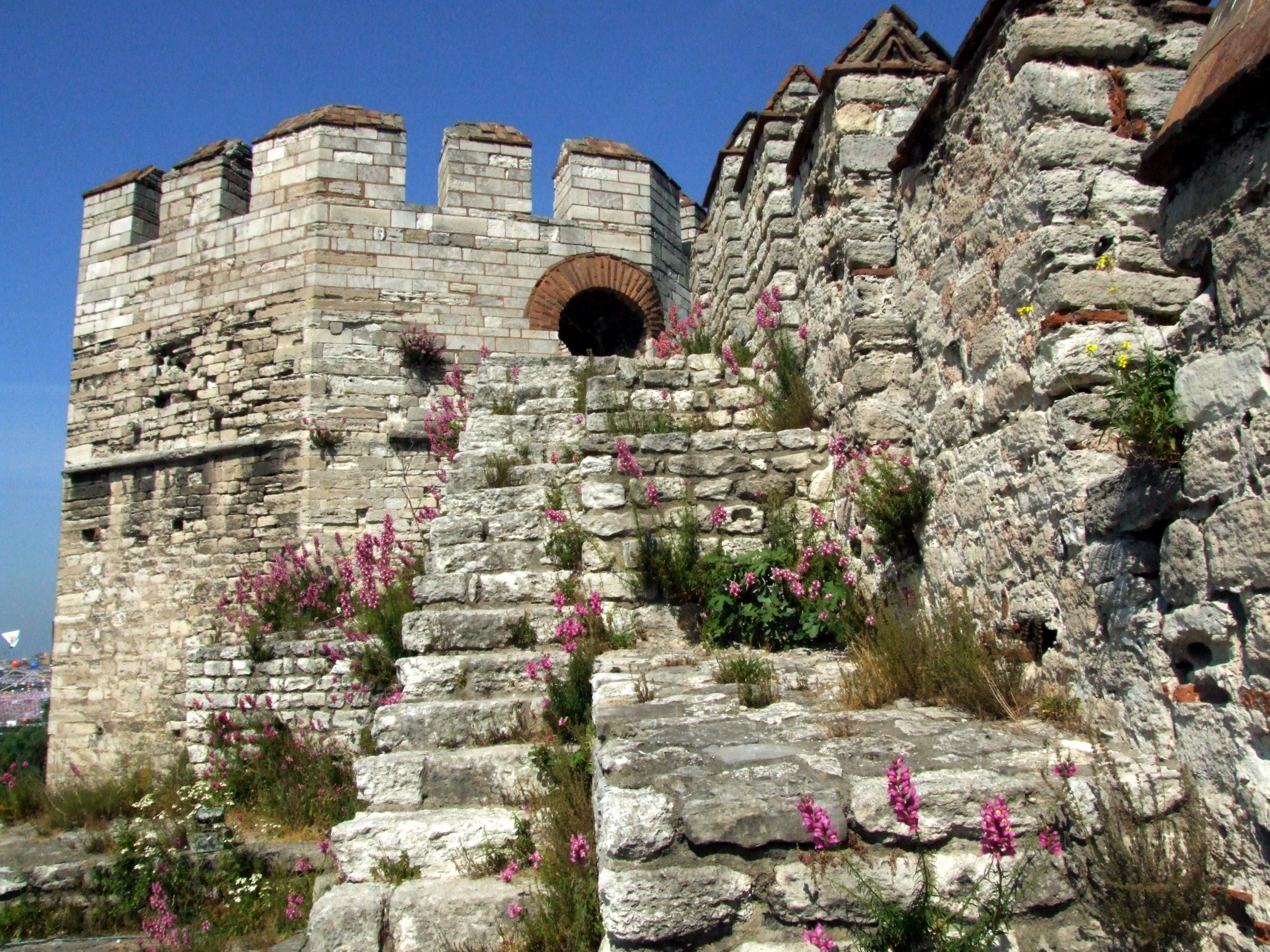
The Yedikule Fortress

The city walls had 55 gates, the largest of which was the Porta Aurea (Golden Gate), the ceremonial entrance gate used by the Emperors, at the southwestern end of the triple land walls, close to the Sea of Marmara. Unlike the city walls which were built of brick and limestone, the Porta Aurea was built of large clean-cut white marble blocks in order to distinguish it from the rest, and a quadriga with elephant statues stood on its top. The doors of the Porta Aurea were made of gold, hence the name, which means "Golden Gate" in Latin.

In 1458, the Ottoman Sultan Mehmed II built the Yedikule Fortress to defend the Porta Aurea, which was incorporated into this castle and still stands as a part of the pentagon-shaped layout of the castle walls. The Column of Marcian (Turkish: Kıztaşı) erected by Marcianus (reigned 450–457) dates from the same period as the triple land walls of Theodosius II.

The most extant Byzantine structure which has survived from the reign of Heraclius is the Prison of Anemas, incorporated into the city walls, at Blachernae. It is a huge castle-like structure with several towers and a network of underground Byzantine prisons.

=== Hagia Sophia and Little Hagia Sophia ===
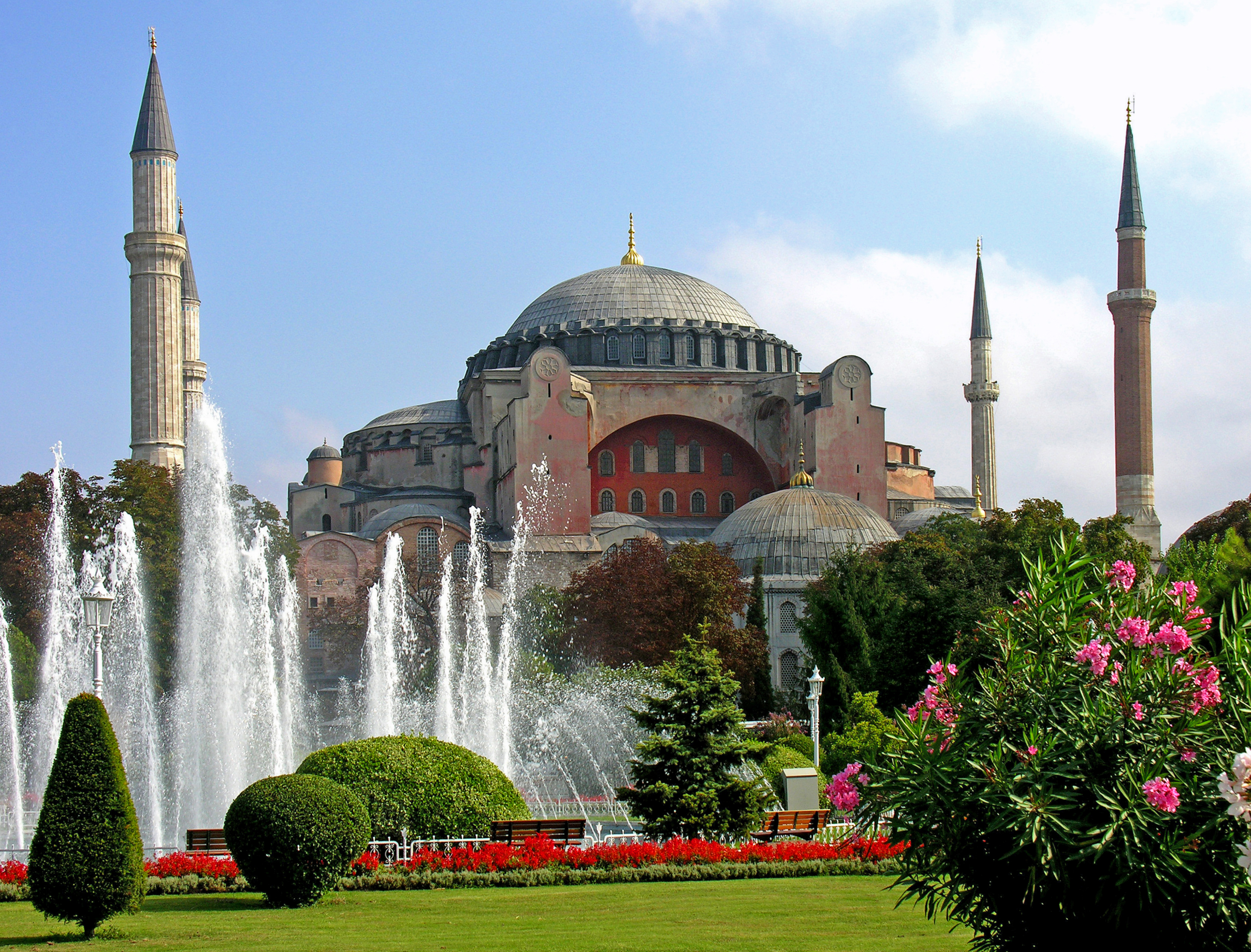
The Hagia Sophia, built by Justinian between 532 and 537, is widely regarded as the masterpiece of Byzantine architecture. It was the largest ever cathedral built in the world for more than a thousand years, until the completion of the Seville Cathedral in 1575, during the Renaissance

The early Byzantine architecture followed the classical Roman model of domes and arches, but further improved these architectural concepts, as evidenced with the Hagia Sophia, which was designed by Isidorus and Anthemius as the third church to rise on this location, between 532 and 537, following the Nika riots (532) during which the second church was destroyed (the first church, known as the Megala Ekklessia (Great Church) was inaugurated by Constantius II in 360; the second church was inaugurated by Theodosius II in 405, while the third and current one was inaugurated by Justinian in 537).

The Church of Saints Sergius and Bacchus (Little Hagia Sophia), which was the first church built by Justinian in Constantinople and constructed between 527 and 536, had earlier signaled such an improvement in the design of domed buildings, which require complex solutions for carrying the structure.

The present-day Hagia Irene (which was originally built by Constantine in the 4th century, but was later enlarged by Justinian in the 6th century) and the Basilica Cistern are also from this period.

=== Stoudios Monastery ===
Most Byzantine churches that were built or enlarged by Justinian in the 6th century were originally built in the 4th century at the time of Constantine. The oldest surviving Byzantine church in Istanbul with its original form is the Stoudios (İmrahor) Monastery, which was built in 462. The monastery is also known as St. John Stoudios because it was dedicated to St. John the Baptist. The roof of the building doesn't exist today, but its surrounding walls as well as its splendid floor decorations are still intact. Many important decisions regarding Christianity were made inside this building, including the heated debates on the identity of Virgin Mary (whether or not she was Theotokos (Mother of God) and whether it was right to condemn Nestorius who opposed this definition) as well as the debates and clashes on Iconoclasm.

=== Hagia Irene ===
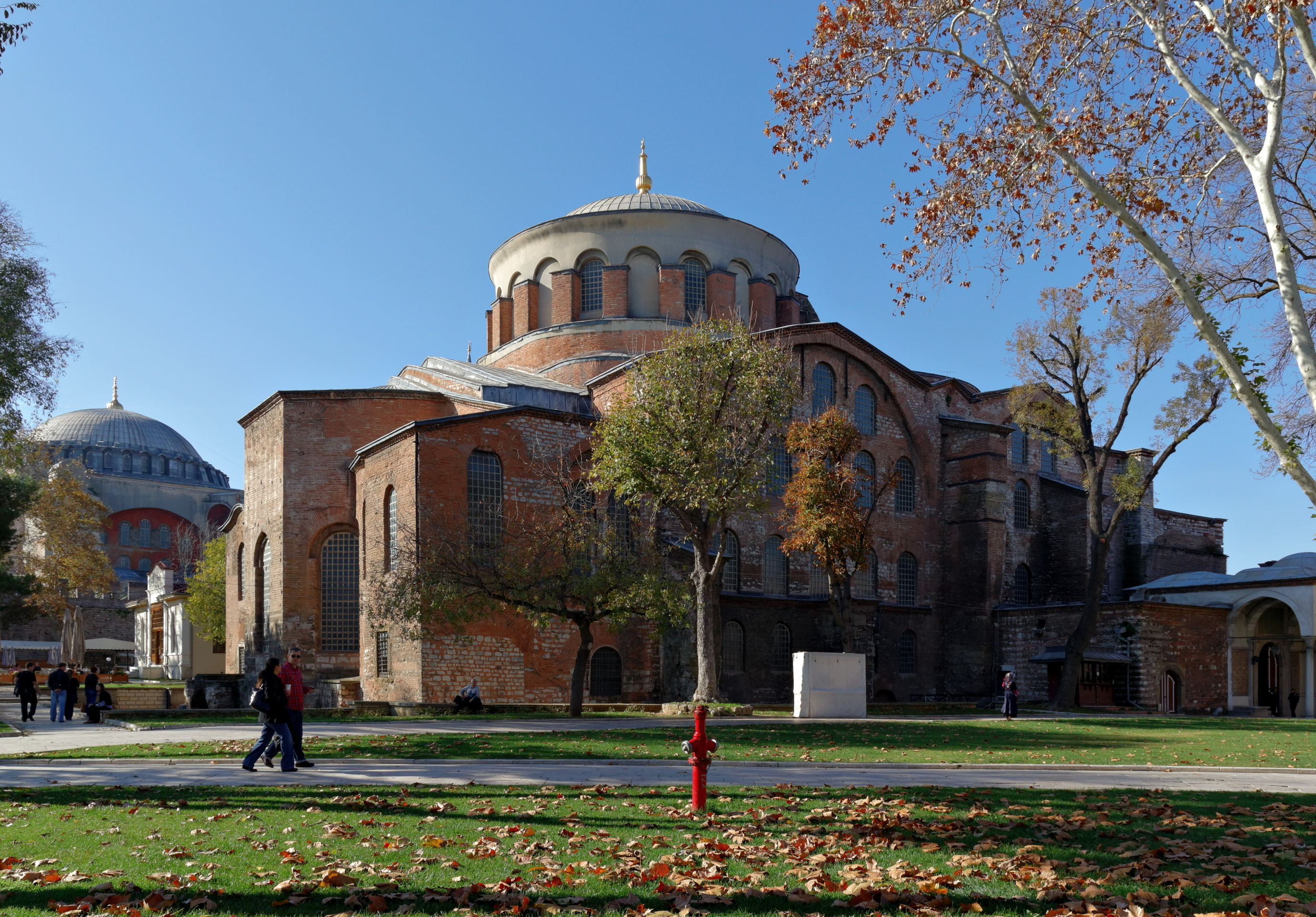
The 4th century Hagia Irene, built by Constantine, is the oldest standing Byzantine church in the city

Following the decision by Theodora, wife of Theophilus, to restore the icons in 843, many churches and other prominent Byzantine buildings in the city were adorned with new icons, but some, like Hagia Irene, still bear the signs of the iconoclastic period. The Boukoleon Palace largely dates from the reign of Theophilus.

=== Blachernae Palace and the Palace of Porphryogenitus ===
The Palace of the Porphyrogenitus (Turkish: Tekfur Sarayı), which is the only surviving part of the Blachernae Palace, dates from the period of the Fourth Crusade. In these years, on the northern side of the Golden Horn, the Dominican priests of the Catholic Church built the Church of Saint Paul in 1233.

=== Chora Church and Pammakaristos Church ===
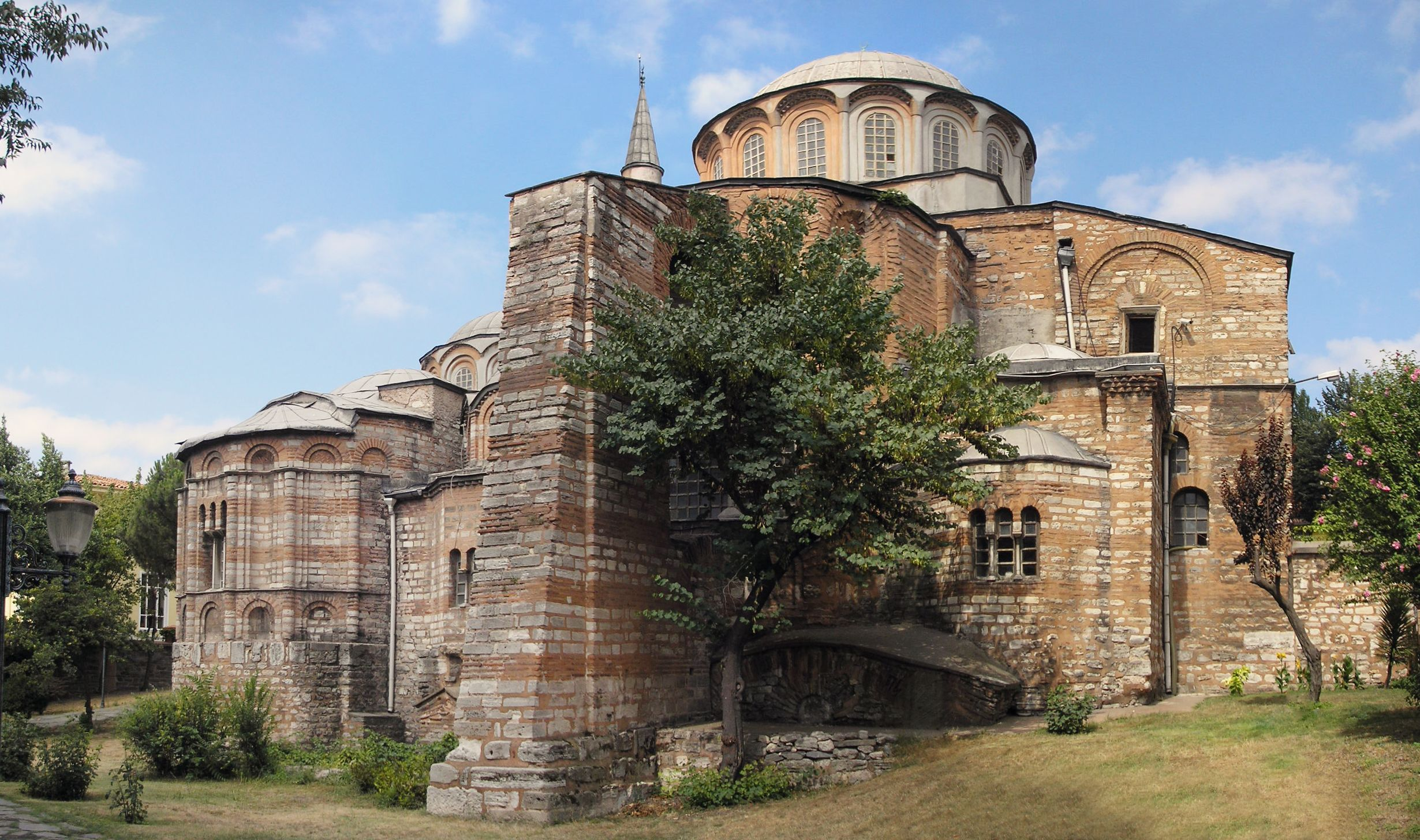
The Chora Church, known as the Kariye Muzesi

The most important churches which were built after the Byzantines took Constantinople back in 1261 include the Chora Church and the Pammakaristos Church. The final structure of the Chora Church that exists reflects the five additions that were finished during the tenure of the last ktetor, Theodore Metochites, from 1316 to 1321. In the year 1511 the church was officially converted into a mosque, and named Kariye Camii. In 1945, the mosque was converted into a museum, and has been named Kariye Muzesi to this day. After many centuries, only the church, the southern chapel, and another building to the north remain.

The Pammakaristos Church was constructed in the early part of the 12th century for Michael VII Ducas and his wife Maria. It was the largest church in the city at that time that served a monastery for women. Before the Ottoman conquest of Constantinople, the sarcophagii of Alexius I Comnenus and his daughter Anna rested within the chapel inside the monastery. In 1453, the nuns were removed, but the church was allowed to remain untouched, except for a giant cross which existed on the dome. The cross was removed by Sultan Suleiman the Magnificent in 1547 after numerous complaints. In 1586, Sultan Murad III converted it into a mosque, naming it the Fethiye Camii.

=== Palazzo del Comune ===
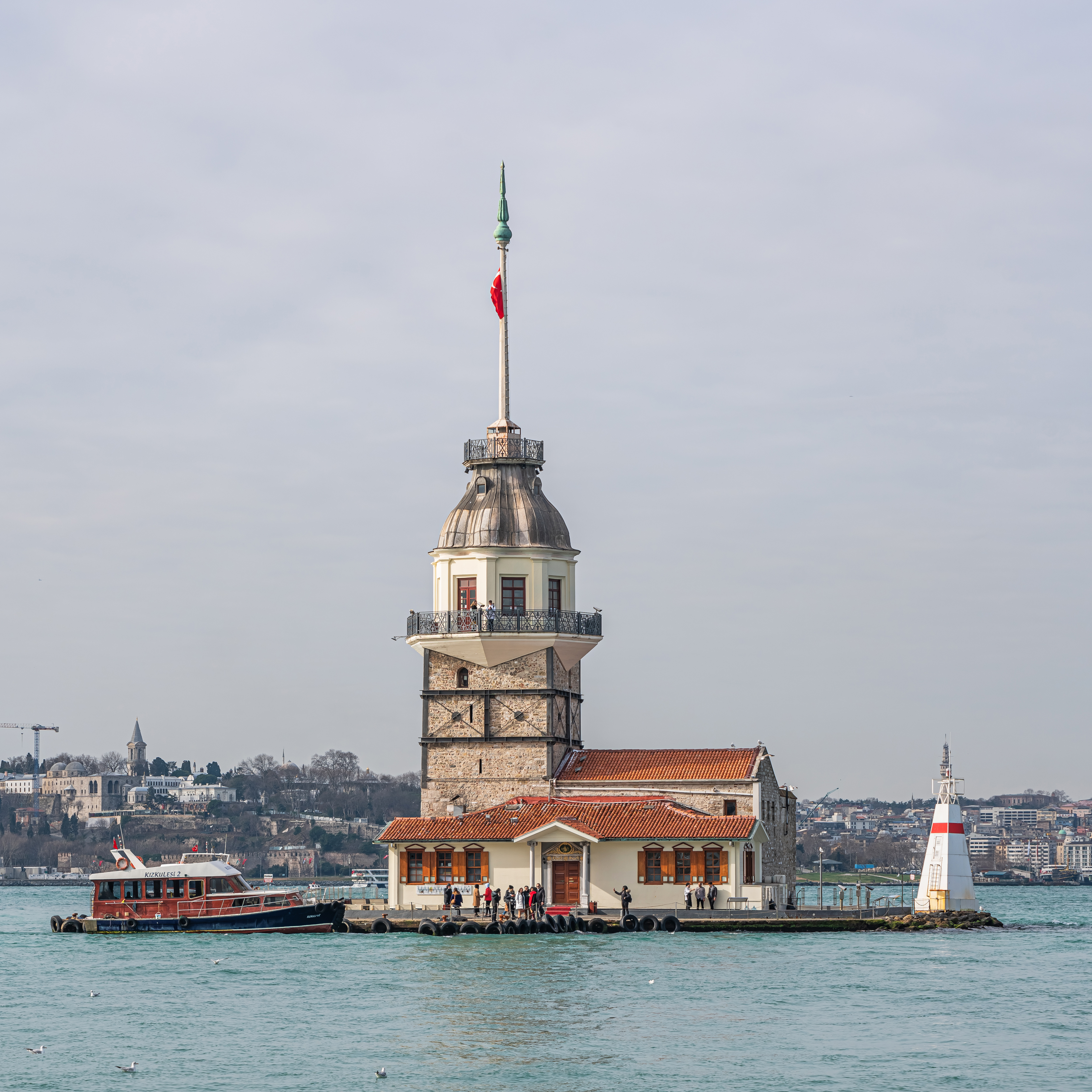
The famous Maiden's (Leander's) Tower was originally built as a wooden structure by Emperor Alexios Komnenos

Also in this period, the Genoese Podestà of Galata, Montano de Marinis, built the Palazzo del Comune (1314), a copy of the San Giorgio Palace in Genoa, which still stands in ruins on the back streets of Bankalar Caddesi in Galata, together with its adjacent buildings and numerous Genoese houses from the early 14th century.

=== Leander's Tower ===
Ancient Athenian general Alcibiades, after the naval victory at Cyzicus, possibly built a custom station for ships coming from Black Sea on a small rock in front of Chrysopolis (today's Üsküdar). In 1110 Byzantine Emperor Alexius Comnenus built on this site a wooden tower protected by a stone wall. The structure, known as Leander's Tower after the legend of Hero and Leander (which took place in the Dardanelles), was rebuilt and restored several times by the Ottoman Turks, until in 1763 it was erected using stone. The most recent restoration was started in 2021 by the Ministry of Culture and Tourism of the Republic of Türkiye and it has been reopened with light shows in 2023.

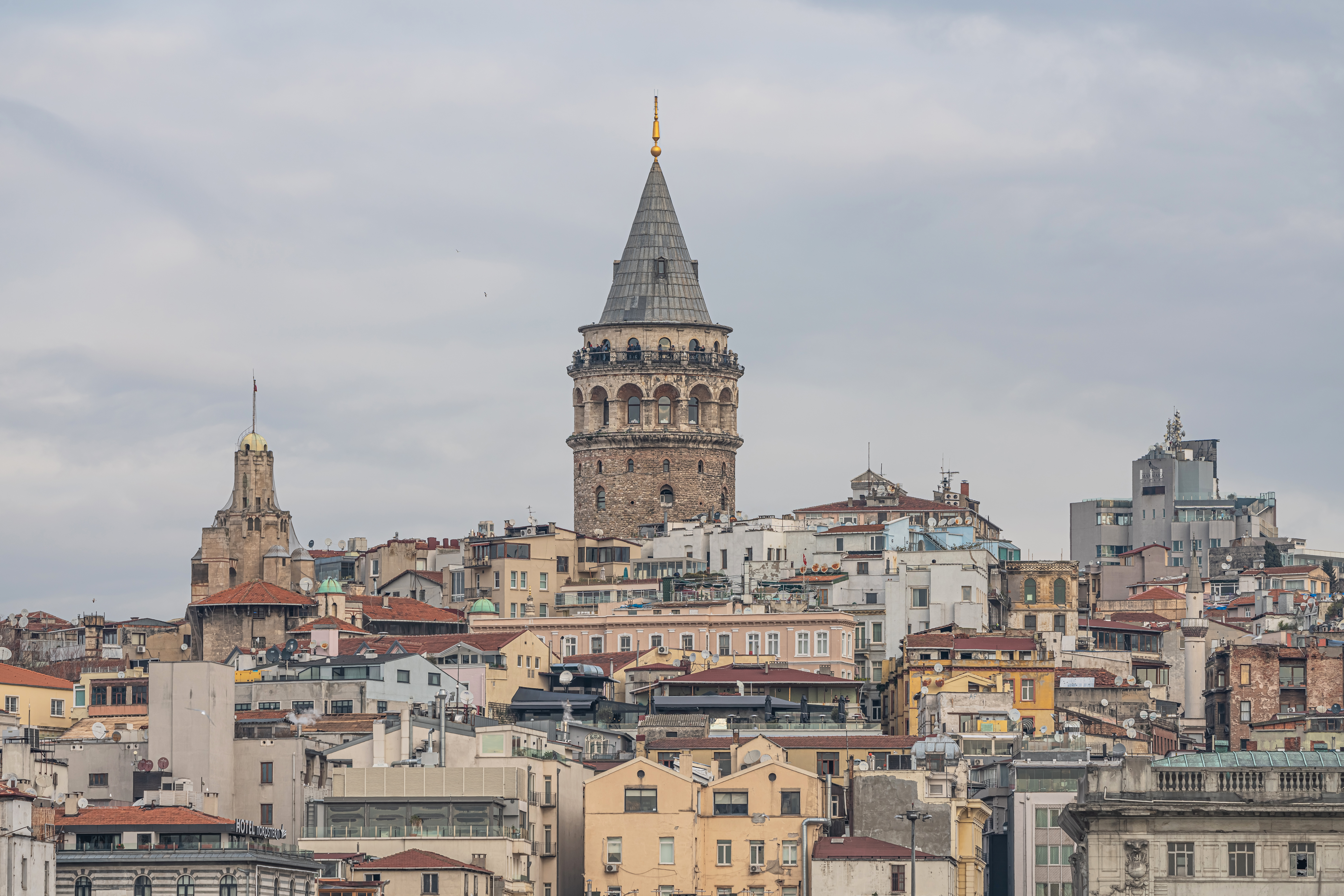
Galata Tower dominates the skyline of the medieval Genoese citadel at the northern shore of the Golden Horn, facing the Old City (peninsula of Constantinople) at the southern shore

=== Galata Tower ===
The Genoese also built the Galata Tower, which they named as Christea Turris (Tower of Christ), at the highest point of the citadel of Galata, in 1348.

== Ottoman structures ==
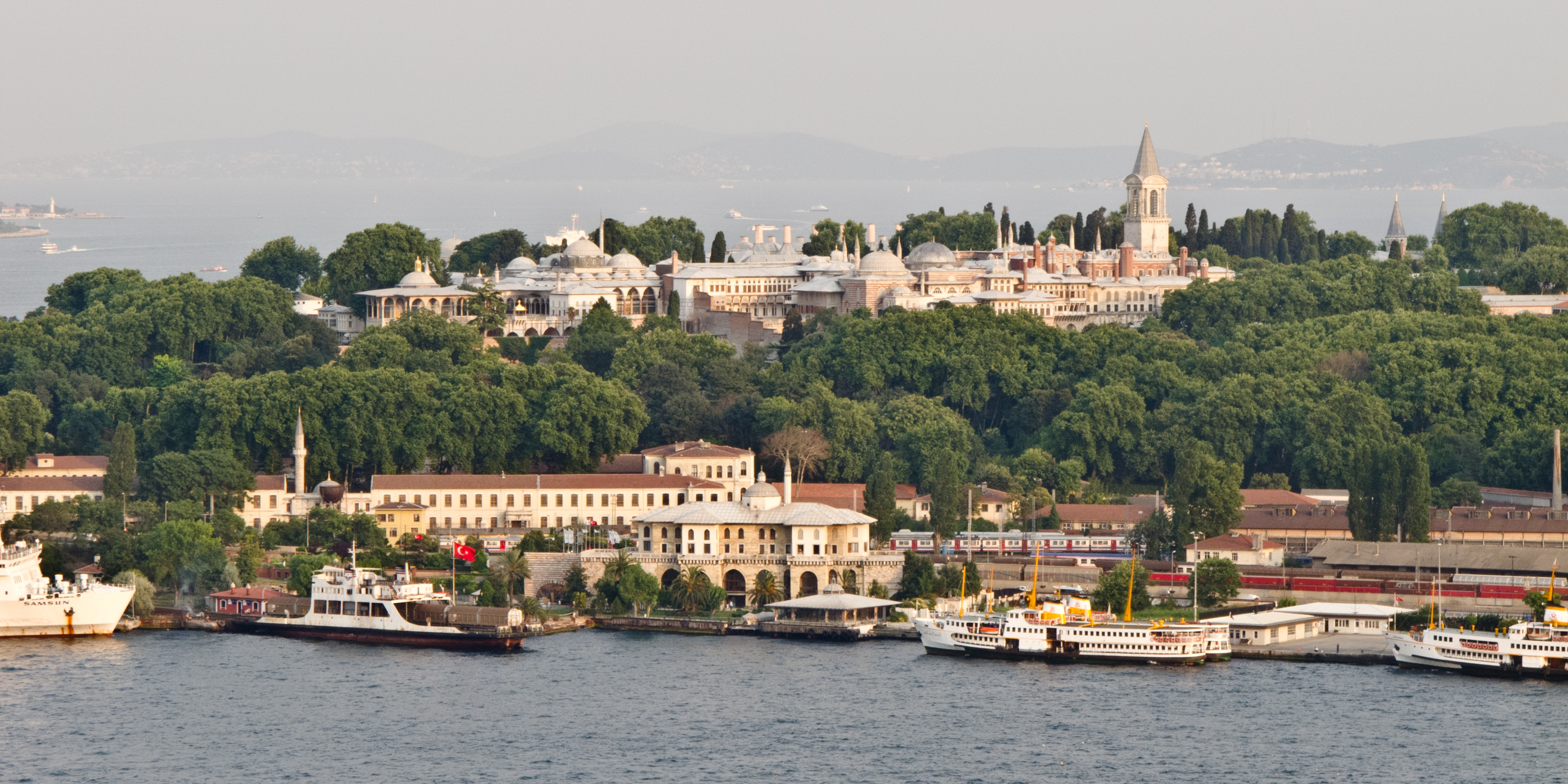
Topkapı Palace

The Ottoman Turks built the Anadoluhisarı on the Asian side of the Bosphorus in 1394, and the Rumelihisarı at the opposite (European) shore, in 1452, a year before the conquest of Constantinople. The main purpose of these castles, armed with the long range Balyemez (Faule Metze) cannons, was to block the sea traffic of the Bosphorus and prevent the support ships from the Genoese colonies on the Black Sea ports, such as Caffa, Sinop, and Amasra, from reaching Constantinople and helping the Byzantines during the Turkish siege of the city.

Following the Ottoman conquest of the city, Sultan Mehmed II initiated a wide scale reconstruction plan, which included the construction of grand buildings such as the Eyüp Sultan Mosque, Fatih Mosque, Topkapı Palace, The Grand Bazaar and the Yedikule (Seven Towers) Castle which guarded the main entrance gate of the city, the Porta Aurea (Golden Gate). In the centuries following Mehmed II, many new important buildings, such as the Süleymaniye Mosque, Sultan Ahmed Mosque, Yeni Mosque and numerous others were constructed.

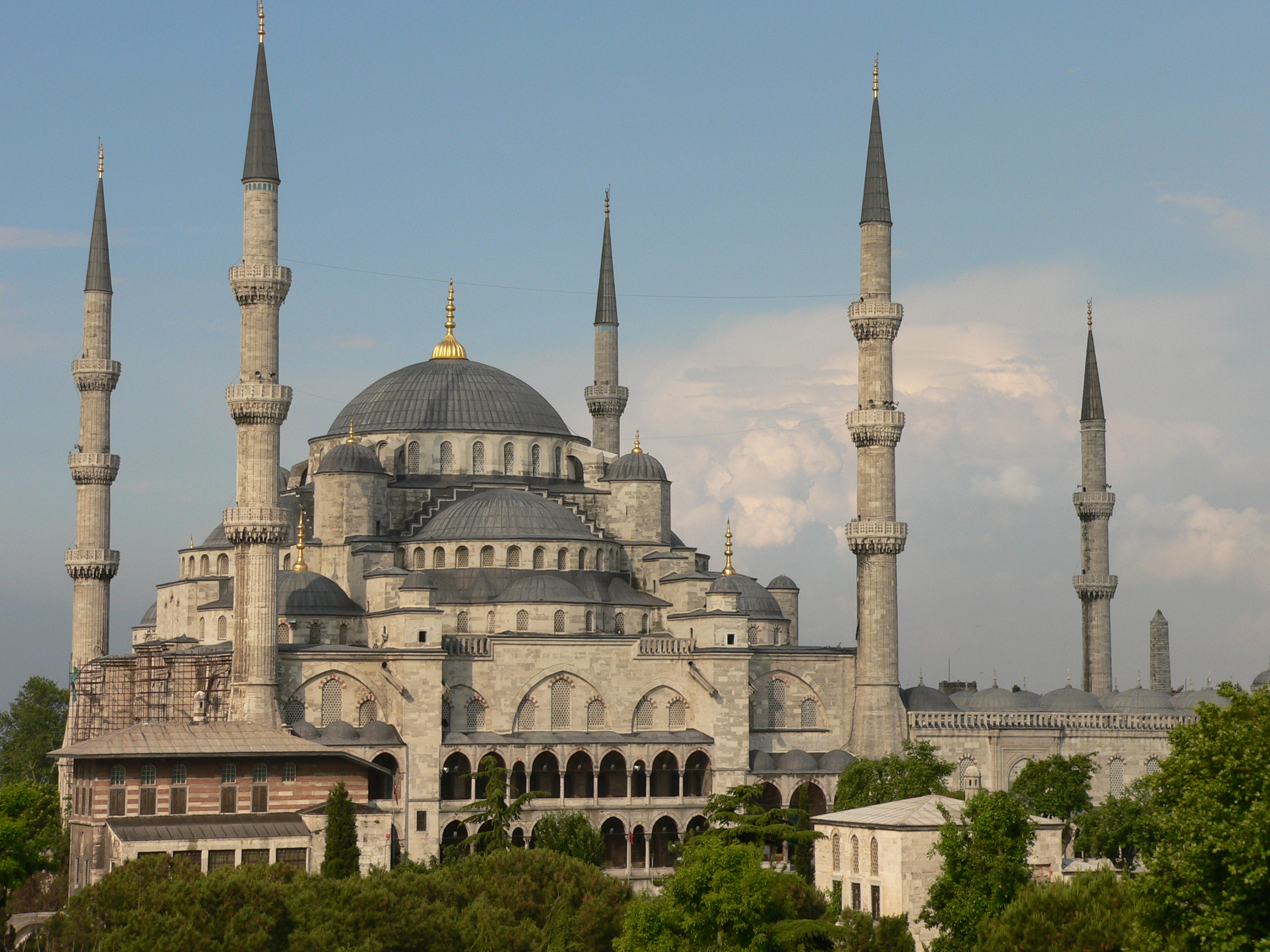
Sultan Ahmed Mosque

Traditionally, Ottoman buildings were built of ornate wood. Only "state buildings" such as palaces and mosques were built of stone. Starting from the 18th and 19th centuries, wood was gradually replaced with stone as the primary building material, while traditional Ottoman architectural styles were gradually replaced with European styles, such as the Baroque style interiors of the Aynalıkavak Palace (1677–1679) and Nuruosmaniye Mosque (1748–1755, the first Baroque style mosque in the city, also famous for its Baroque fountain), and the 18th century Baroque additions to the Harem section of Topkapı Palace. Following the Tanzimat reforms which effectively started Ottoman Empire's Europeanization process in 1839, new palaces and mosques were built in Neoclassical, Baroque and Rococo styles, or a mixture of all three, such as the Dolmabahçe Palace, Beylerbeyi Palace and Ortaköy (Mecidiye) Mosque designed and constructed by the Balyan family members. Even Neo-Gothic mosques were built, such as the Pertevniyal Valide Sultan Mosque and Yıldız Hamidiye Mosque. Large state buildings like schools or military barracks were also built in various European styles.

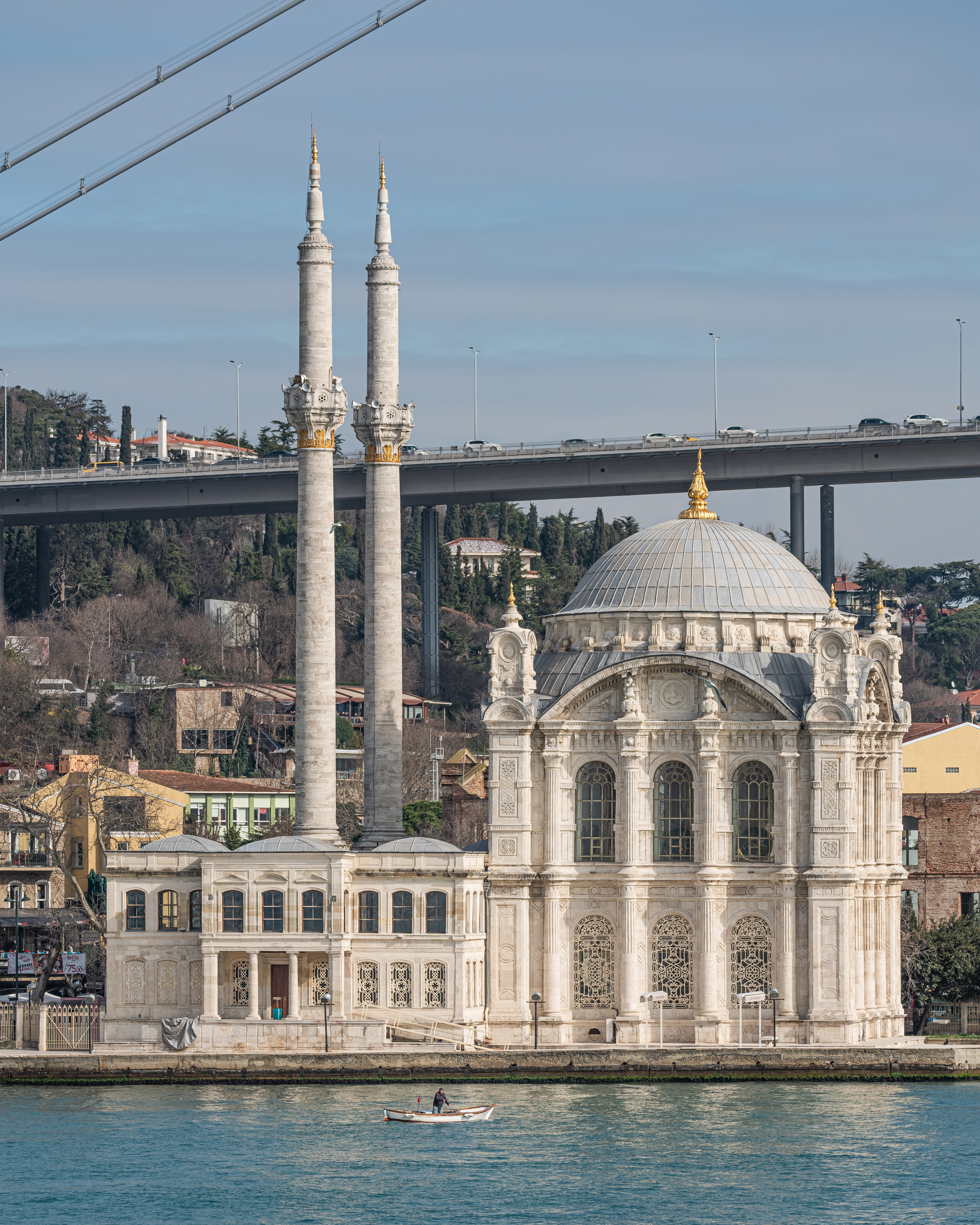
Ortaköy Mosque and the Bosphorus Bridge

Starting from the early 19th century, the areas around İstiklal Avenue were filled with grandiose embassy buildings belonging to prominent European states, and rows of European (mostly Neoclassical and later Art Nouveau) style buildings started to appear on both flanks of the avenue. Istanbul especially became a major center of the Art Nouveau movement in the late 19th and early 20th centuries, with famous architects of this style like Raimondo D'Aronco building many palaces and mansions in the city proper and on the Princes' Islands. His most important works in the city include several buildings of the Yıldız Palace complex, and the Botter House on İstiklal Avenue. The famous Camondo Stairs on Bankalar Caddesi (Banks Street) in Karaköy (Galata) is also a beautiful example of Art Nouveau architecture. Other important examples are the Hıdiv Kasrı (Khedive Palace) on the Asian side of the Bosphorus, Flora Han in Sirkeci, and Frej Apartmanı in the Şişhane quarter of Beyoğlu.

Thus, by the mid-19th century, the southern part of the Golden Horn (the historic peninsula of Constantinople) had a traditionally Ottoman Turkish appearance and population, while the northern part of the Golden Horn became more and more Europeanized both in terms of architecture and in terms of demographics. The Galata Bridge had become a connection between the oriental and occidental (southern and northern) parts of the European side of Istanbul.

The Bosphorus was regarded as a summer resort during the Ottoman period and the traditional wooden houses and mansions, called yalı, were the choice of the wealthy Ottoman elite. Most of the development happened during the Tulip Period, a period which is best represented by the Sadullah Paşa Yalısı built in 1783. The oldest surviving yalı is the Amcazade Köprülü Hüseyin Pasha yalı located in Kandilli on the Asiatic shores of the Bosphorus and dates from 1699. The wooden seaside chalet mansions retained their basic architectural principles until the middle of the 19th century, when they were gradually replaced by less flammable brick houses especially during the First Constitutional Period. The development of yalıs lasted until the First World War.

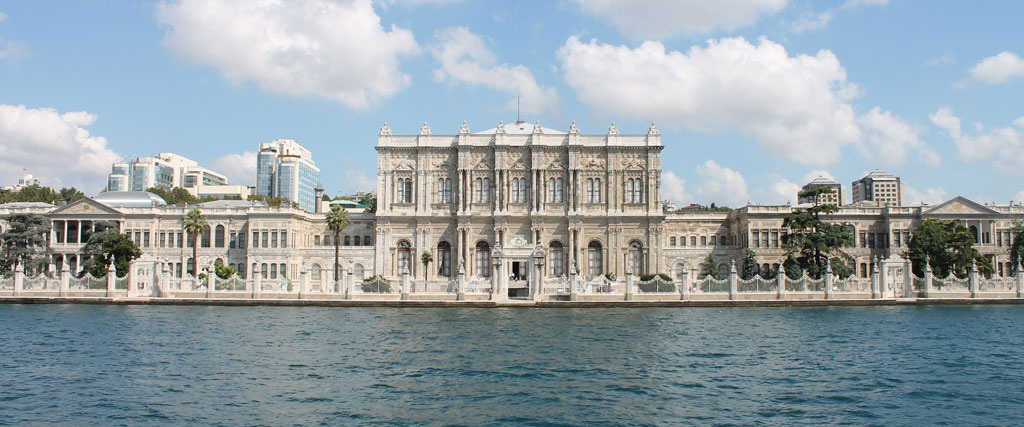
The Dolmabahçe Palace was built in 1856, served as the main administrative center of the Ottoman Empire from 1856 to 1922, apart from a 22-year interval (1887–1909) in which Yıldız Palace was used.

== Contemporary architecture ==
Contemporary architecture is more common in the Levent Business District of Istanbul, which is located six miles from the historic center. One of the most iconic contemporary buildings is the Istanbul Sapphire, a blue-glass skyscraper that contains a popular shopping mall and a rooftop viewing platform.

The Golden Horn Metro Bridge is a cable stayed bridge and another example of modern architecture in Istanbul. It connects the historic center of Istanbul to the opposite side of Golden Horn.

=== Earthquake resilience ===
In earthquake-prone areas, all buildings built to 20th century standards may be dangerous, but shortly after the 1999 İzmit earthquake, which killed over 17 thousand people, a new seismic code was brought into force to protect against earthquakes in Turkey. Also following that earthquake a so-called earthquake tax was raised during the government of Bülent Ecevit. Initially thought as a temporary tax, it became permanent. In 2007 the seismic code was strengthened. However, it is alleged that builders often ignored the rules due to corruption. After the 2011 Van earthquakes Prime Minister Recep Tayyip Erdoğan said: "Municipalities, constructors and supervisors should now see that their negligence amounts to murder." In 2018, a zoning law gave amnesties to some unlicensed buildings and some with unlicensed floors.

Further resilience over the 2007 code was mandated in the 2018 Turkish Seismic Code, which took effect on 1 January 2019. Improvements included design supervision and site specific hazard definitions, and for new buildings in vulnerable regions required rebar in high quality concrete. Beams and columns in those buildings must be in the right place to properly absorb shaking. The code is said by foreign experts to be very modern and similar to US codes. However, these 21st century building codes were not very well enforced.

In a bid to shore up support going into the 2018 Turkish presidential election, the government offered amnesties for violations of the building code, allowing non-compliance to continue with the payment of a fee. This poor enforcement of seismic codes was a contributing factor to the devastation of the 2023 Turkey–Syria earthquakes in which over 42,000 people died in Turkey. There were high incidences of support column failure leading to pancake collapses, which complicated rescue efforts. Experts lamented the practice would turn cities into graveyards. The 2023 Turkey–Syria earthquakes collapsed many older buildings and some recent ones: the Environment and Urbanization Ministry is assessing the damage.

Unreinforced masonry buildings are vulnerable. Many older buildings in Istanbul are vulnerable to pancake collapses. Retrofitting old buildings is possible but expensive. Although over 3 million housing units nationwide were strengthened in the 2 decades before 2023, as of that year many apartment blocks do not meet 21st century standards. Building with wood has been suggested.

== Gallery ==
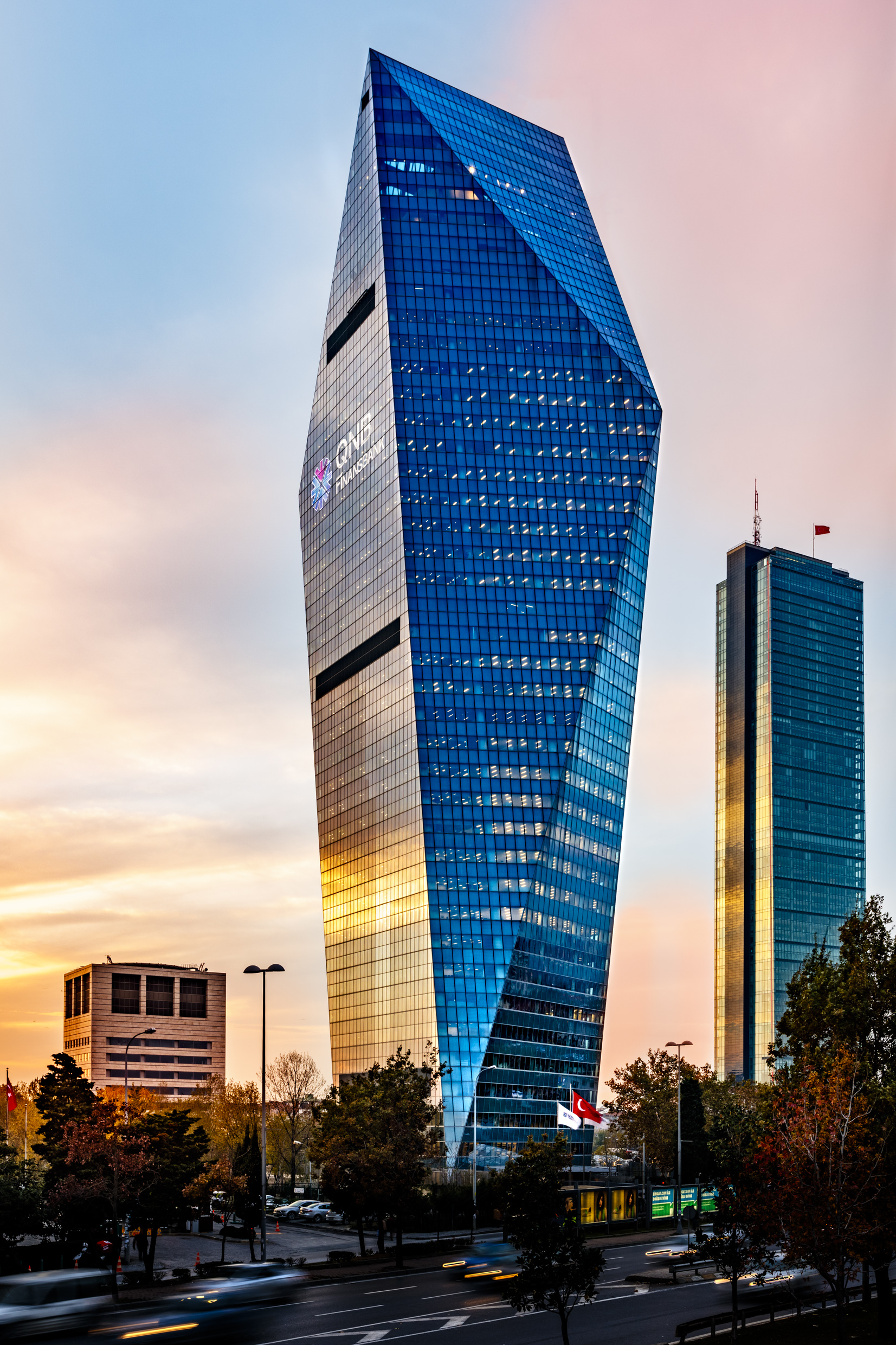
Finansbank Tower and Istanbul Sapphire on Büyükdere Avenue

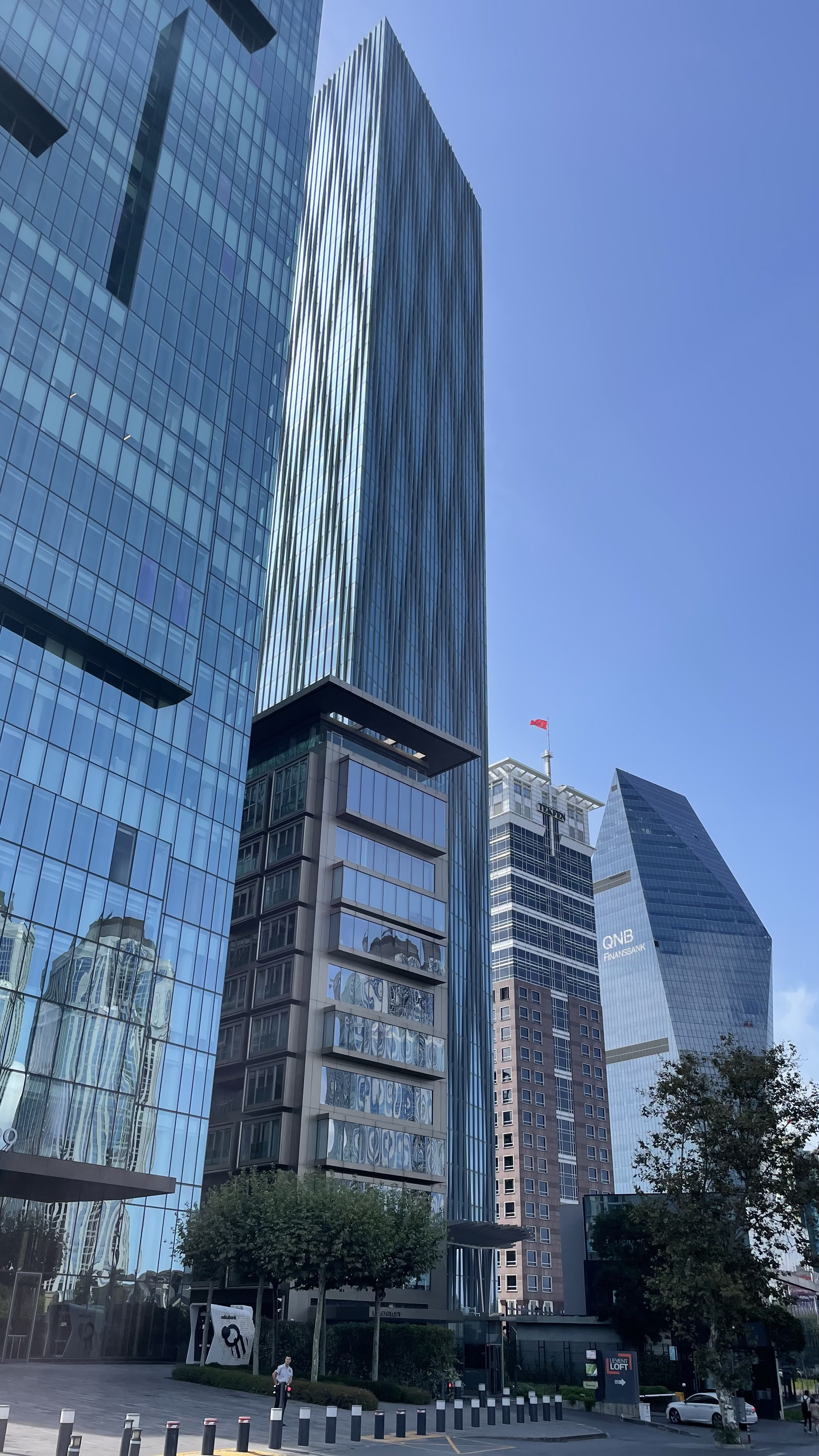
Skyscrapers on the Büyükdere Avenue

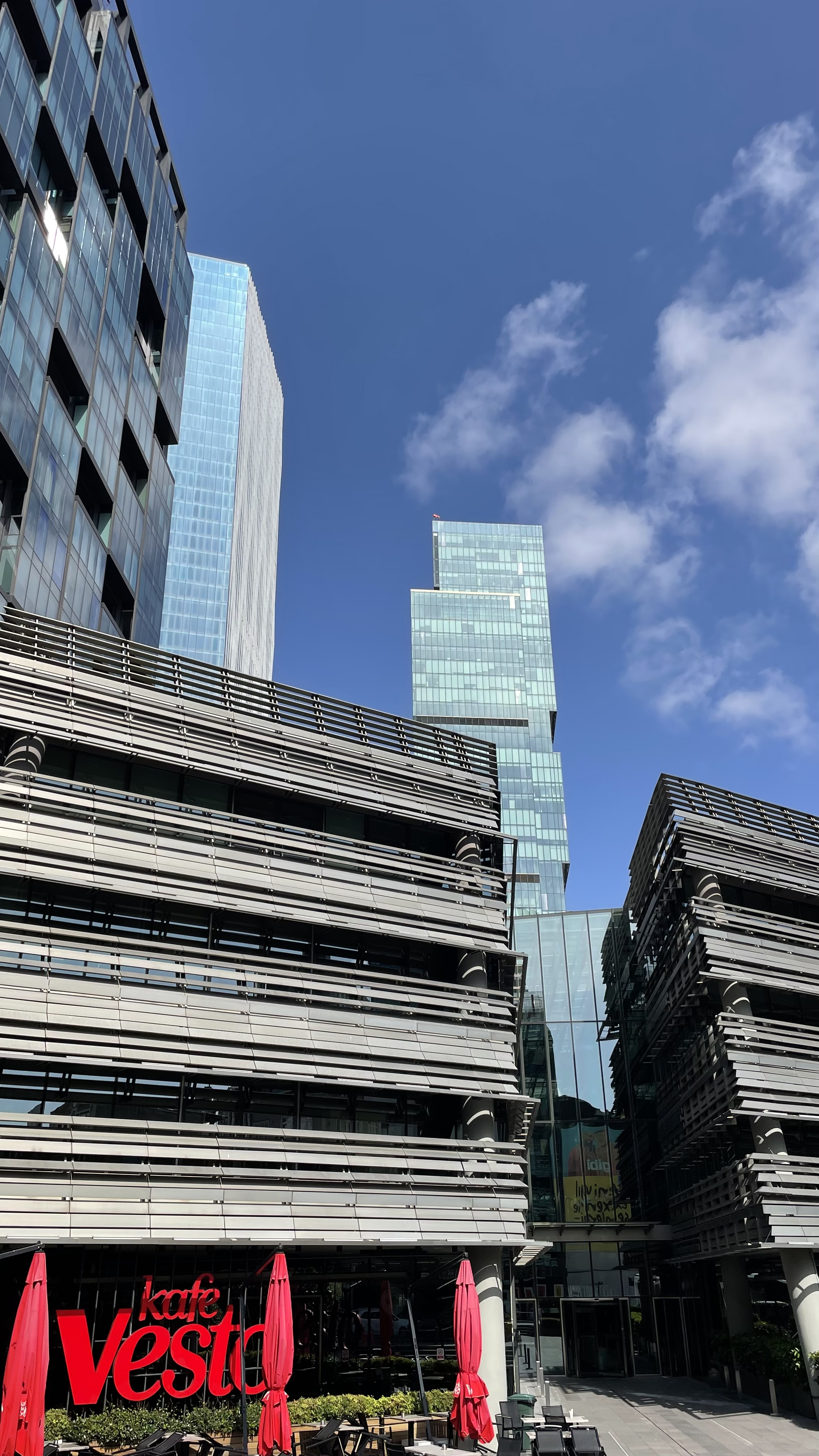
Levent District of Istanbul

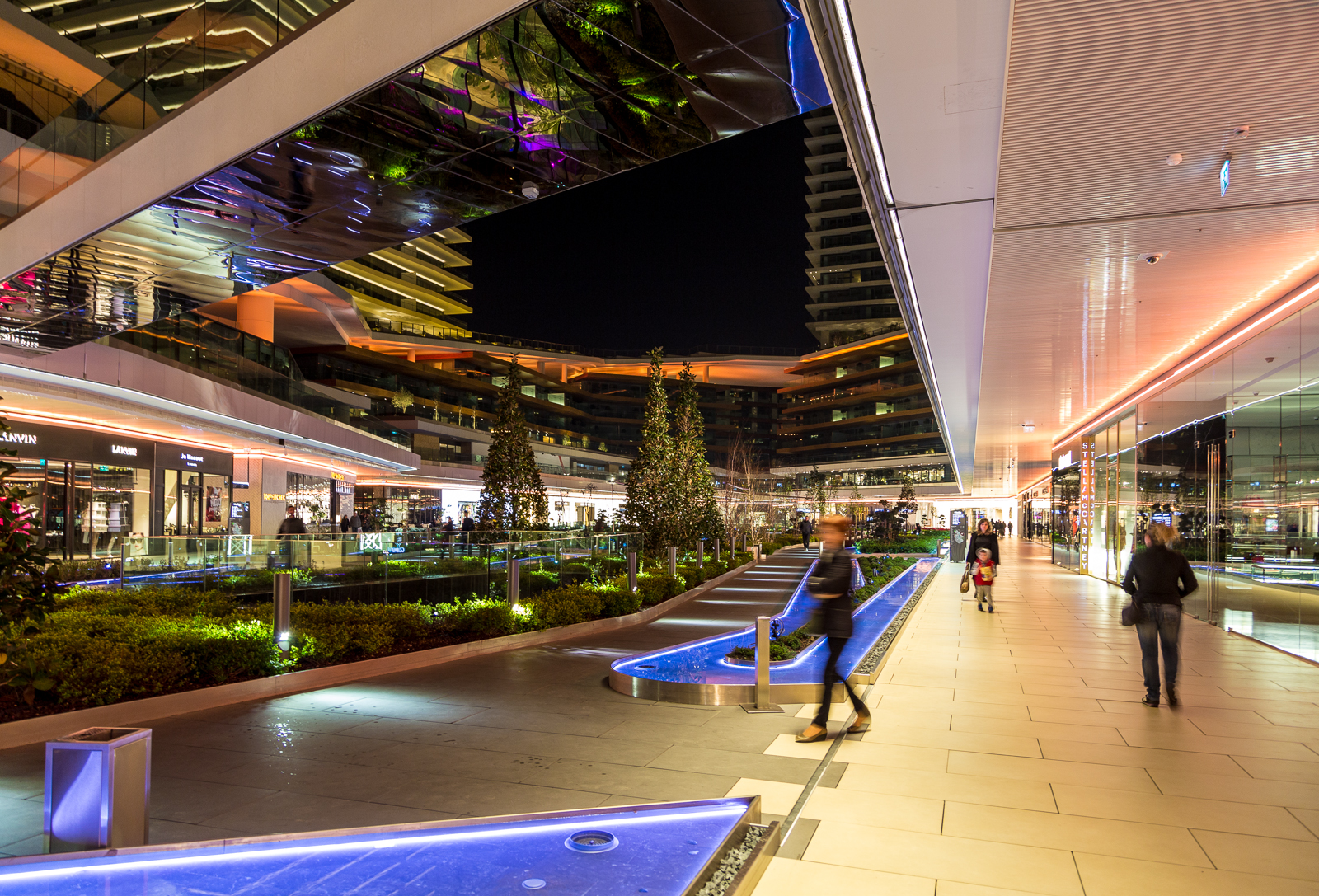
Zorlu Center

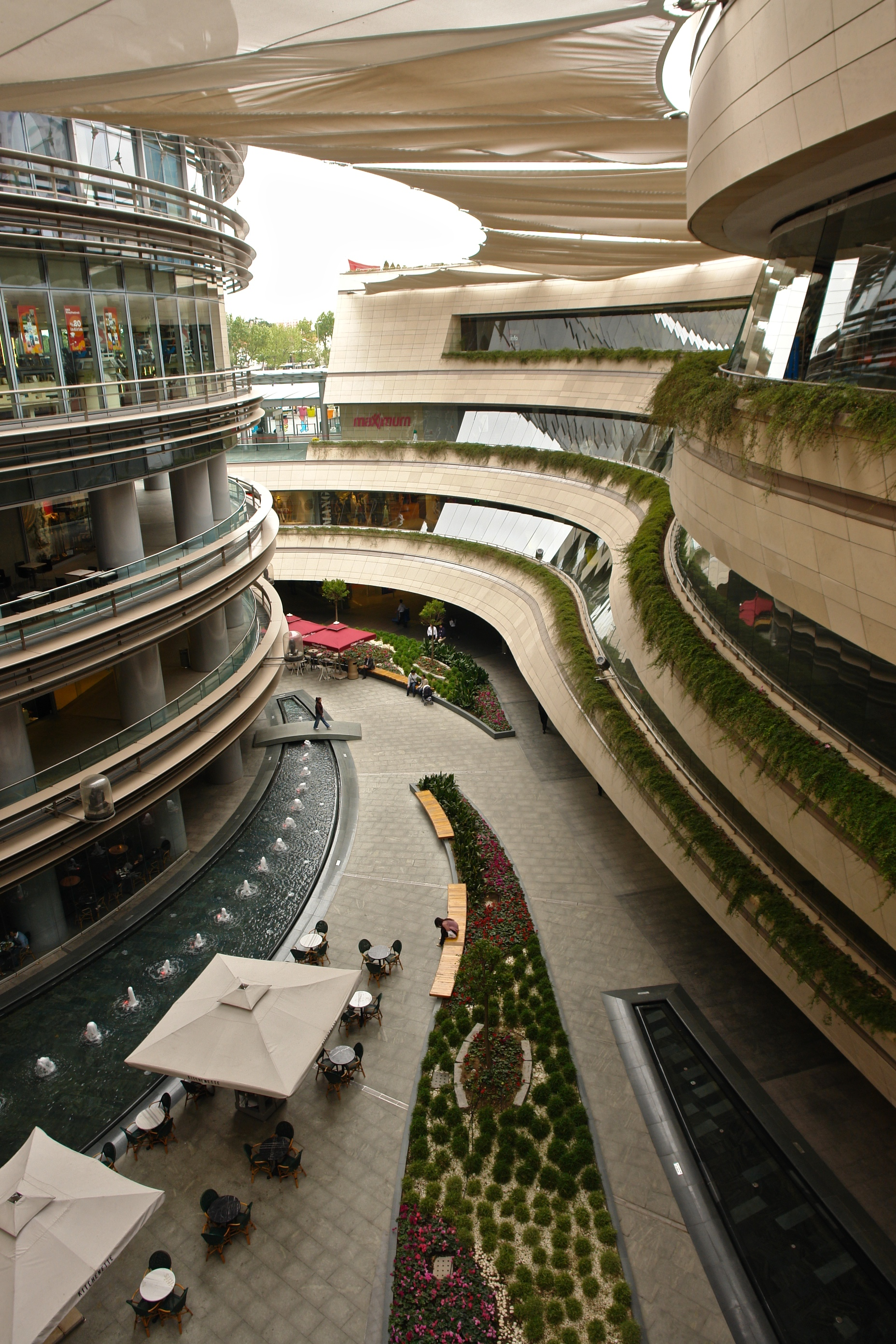
Kanyon Shopping Mall

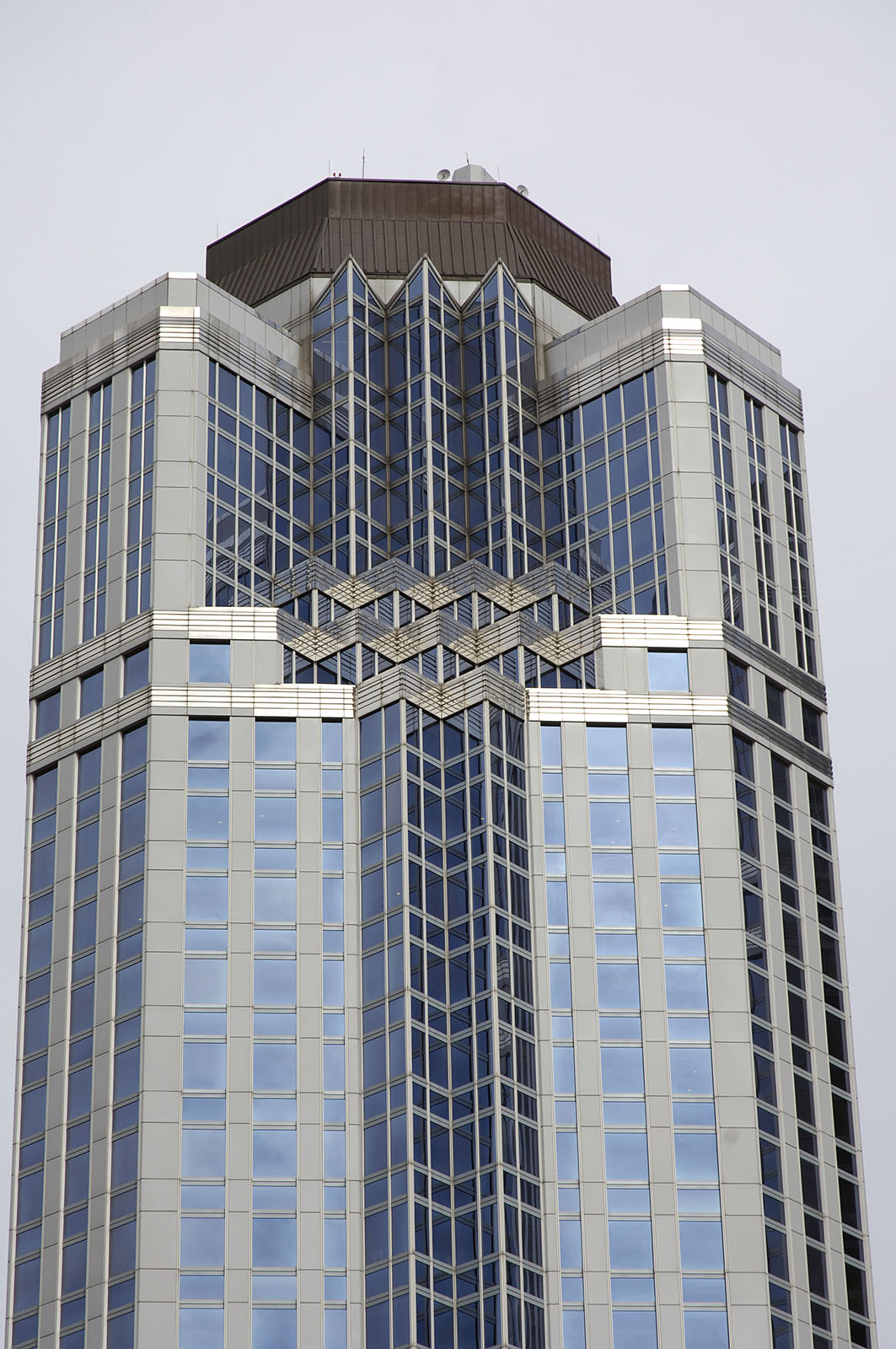
Türkiye İş Bankası Tower 1 (1995–2000) in Levent, Istanbul

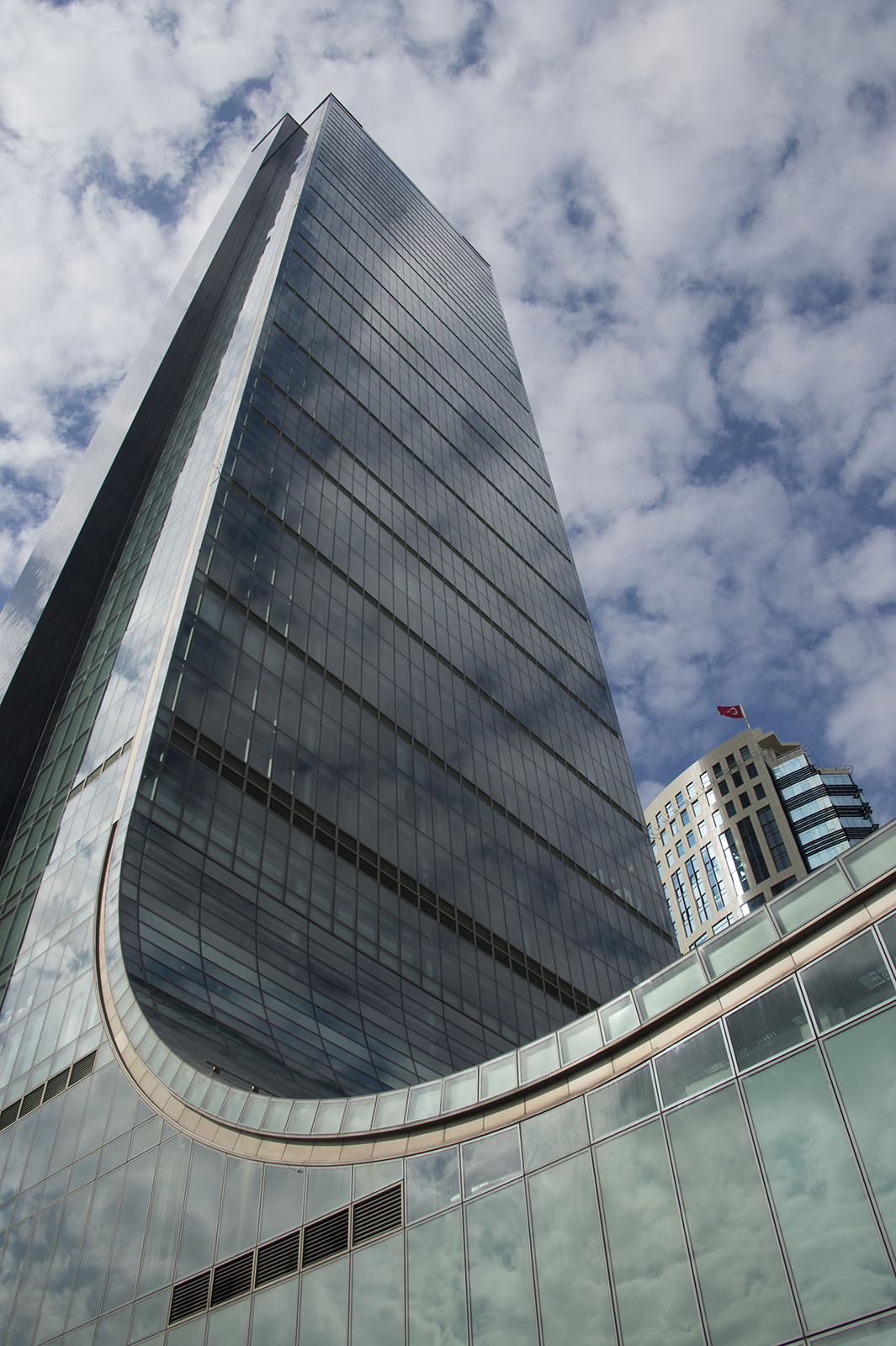
Istanbul Sapphire in Levent (2006–2011) is currently the tallest building in Istanbul and Turkey, and the 4th tallest in Europe.

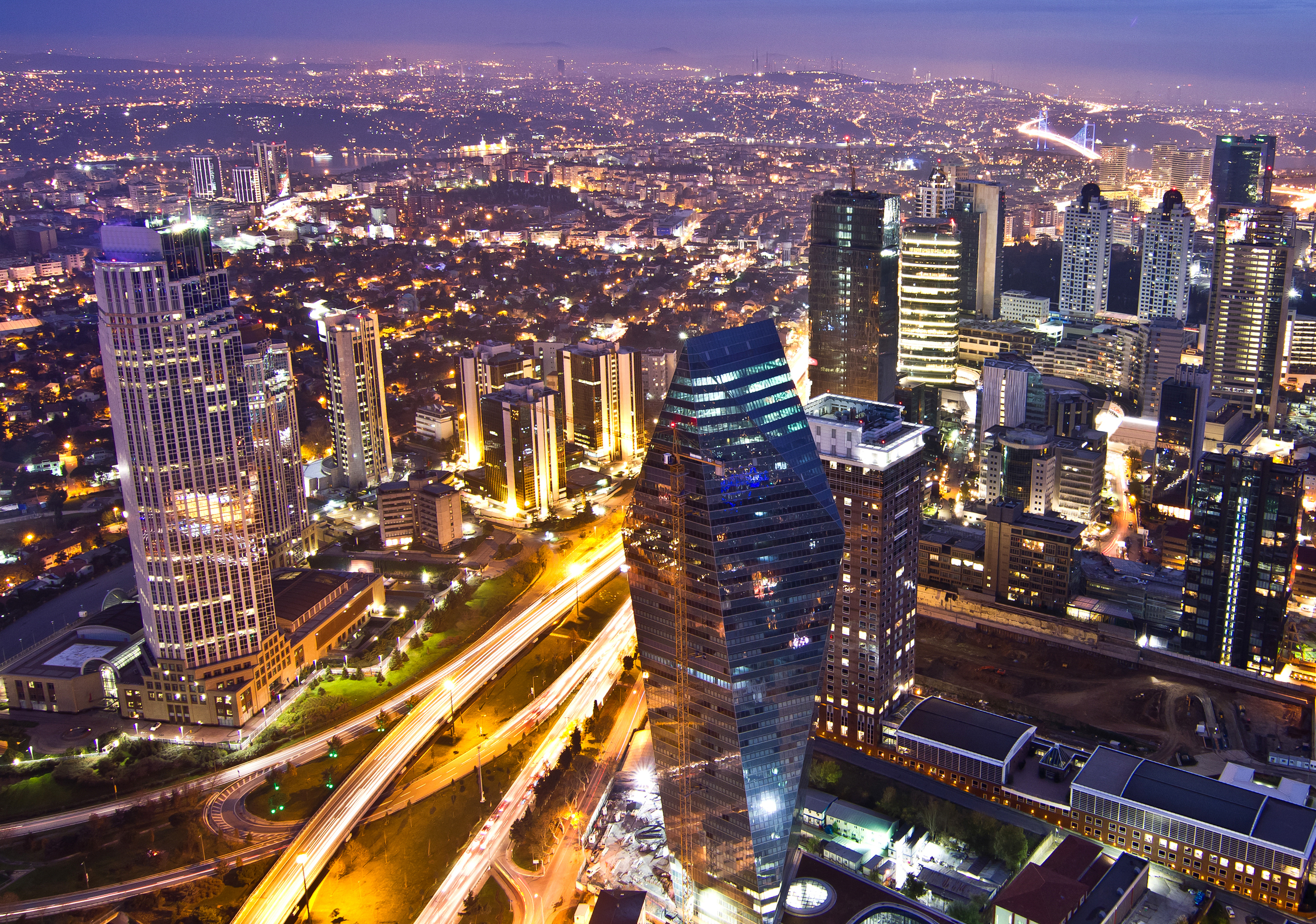
Skyline in Istanbul

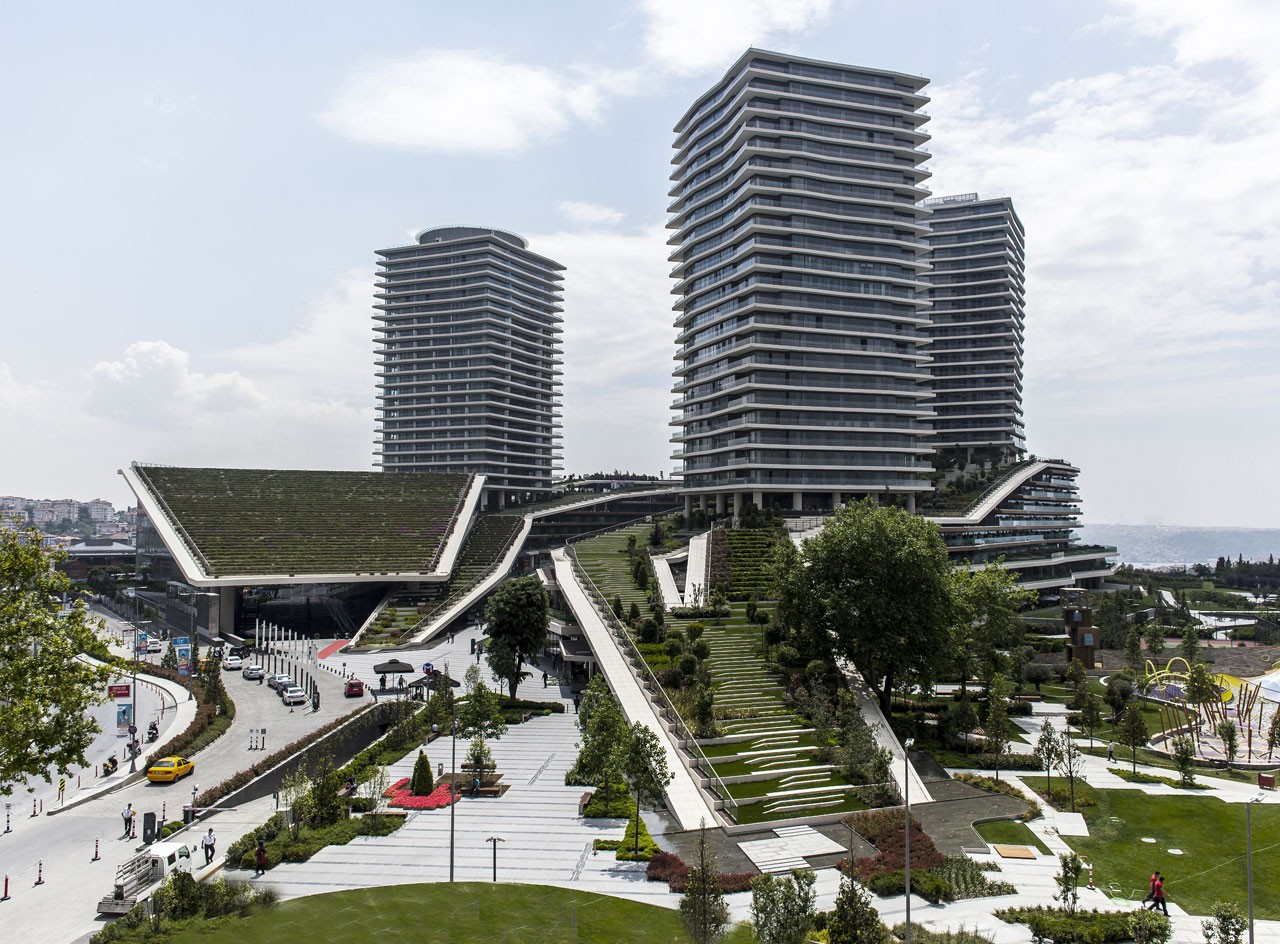
Zorlu Center, Istanbul (2013)

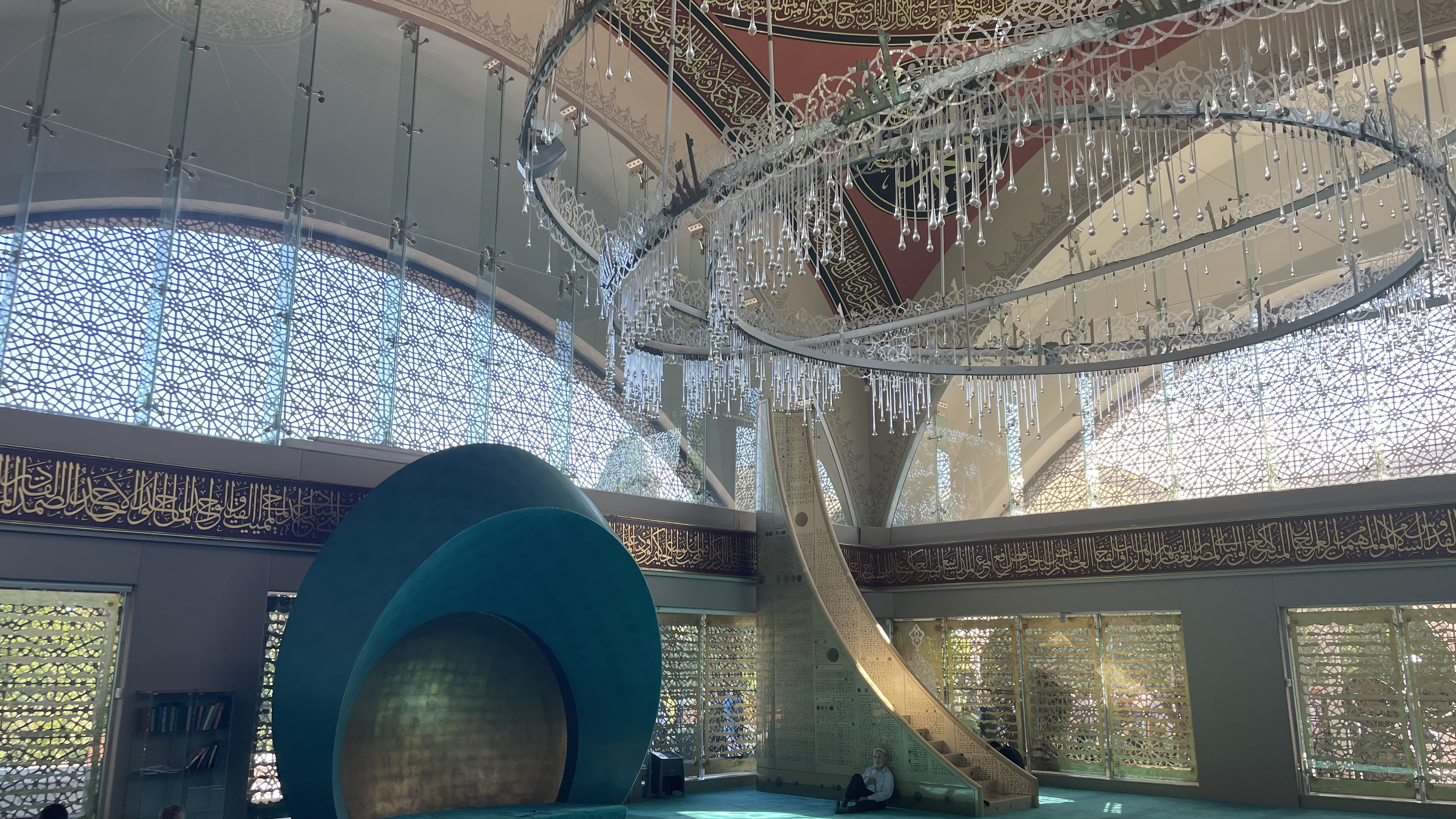
Sakirin Mosque, The mosque's architect is believed to be the first woman to design a mosque. (2009)

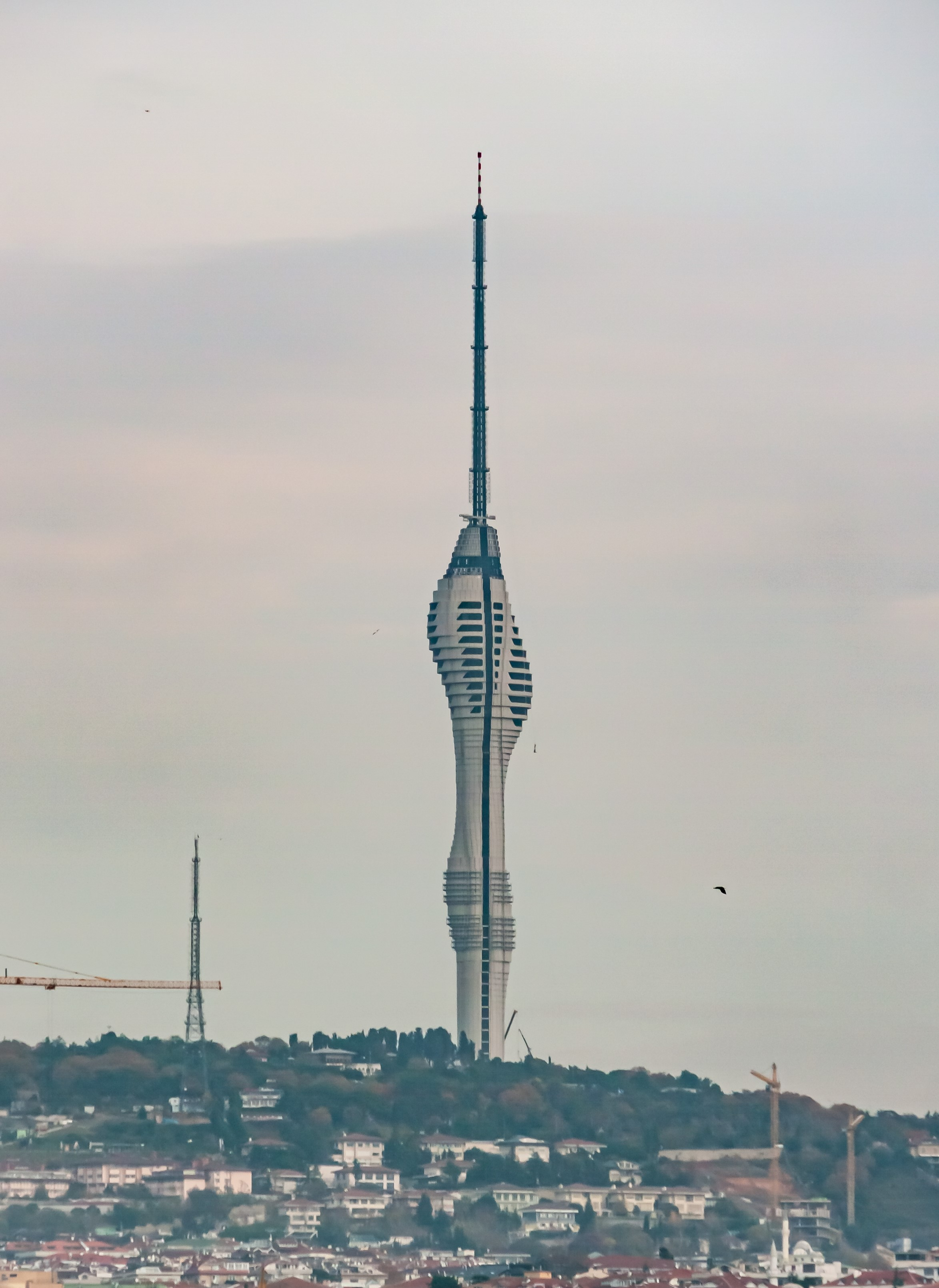
Küçük Çamlıca TV Radio Tower

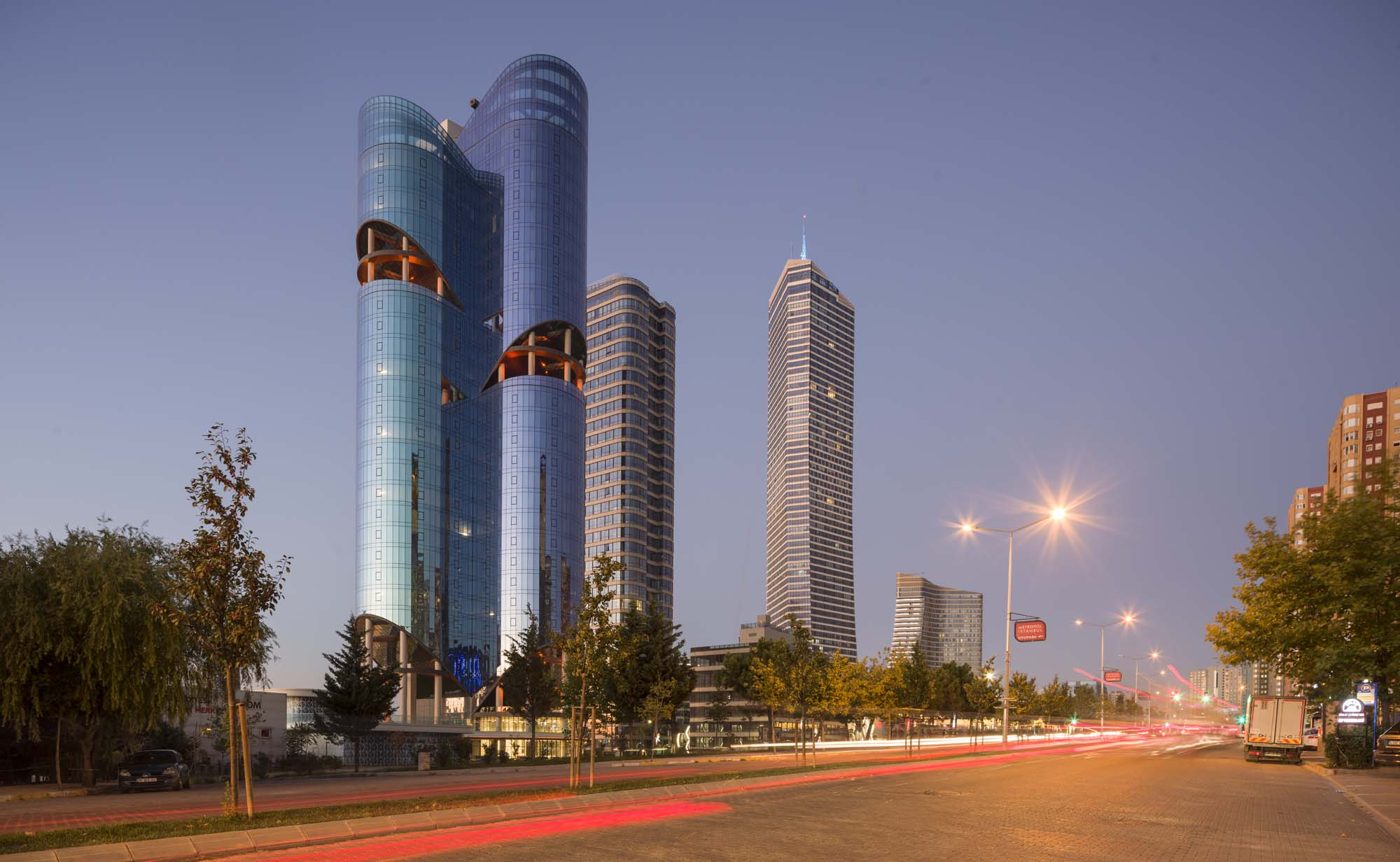
Asian side of Istanbul

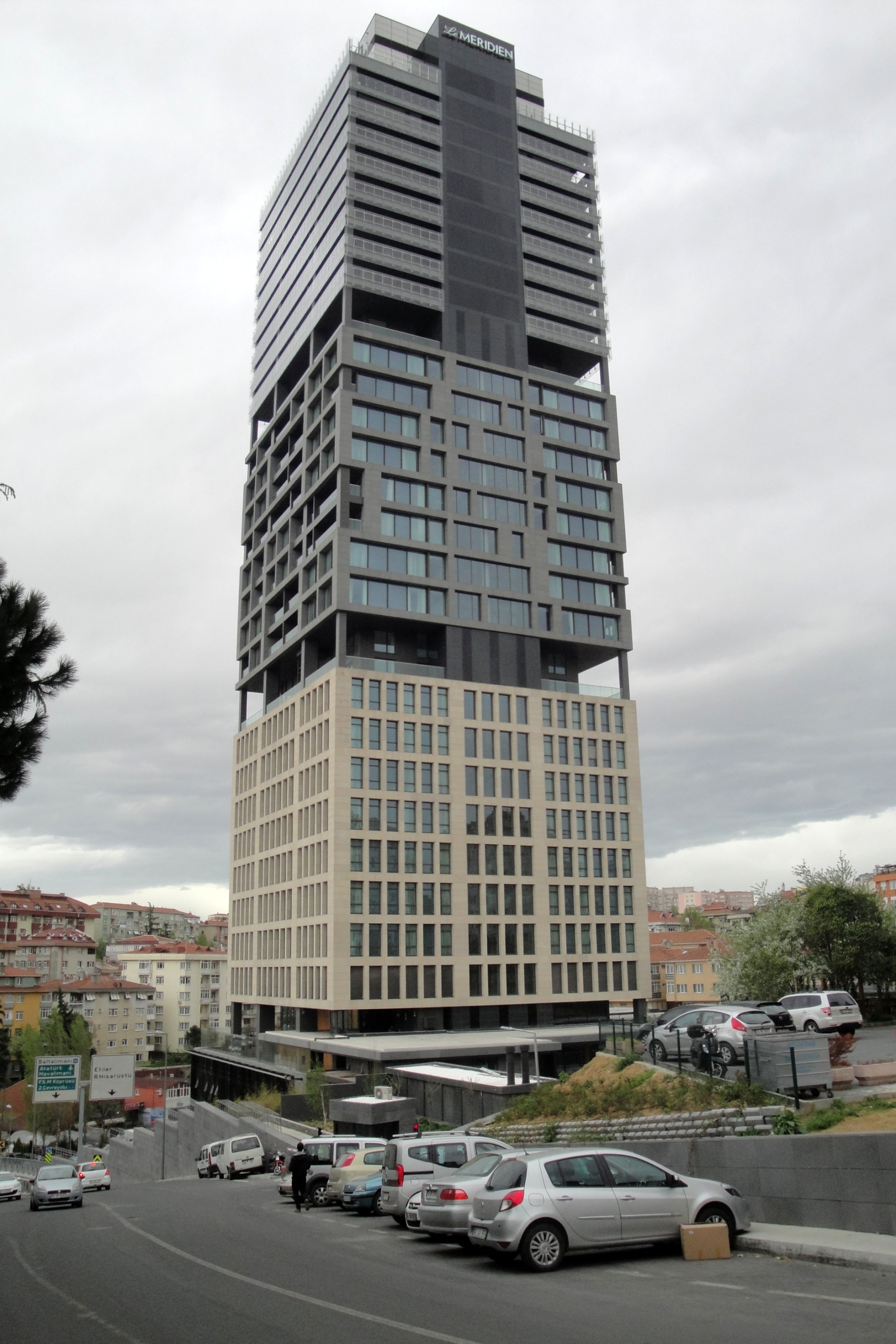
Le Méridien Etiler Hotel

== Related lists ==
- List of architectural structures in Istanbul
- List of columns and towers in Istanbul
- List of museums and monuments in Istanbul
- List of tallest buildings in Istanbul
- List of mosques in Istanbul
- List of churches in Istanbul
- List of synagogues in Istanbul

== Sources ==
- Gül, Murat &, Howells, Trevor (2013). Istanbul Architecture. Boorowa: Watermark Press. ISBN 9780949284938.
