= Scifoni =

Scifoni is an Italian surname. Notable people with the surname include:

- Anatolio Scifoni (1841–1884), Italian painter
- Giovanni Scifoni (born 1976), Italian actor and theatre director
- Ida Botti Scifoni (1812–1844), Italian artist
