= 557 Constantinople earthquake =

Magnitude 6.4 M (Extreme) earthquake

- Location within Marmara
- Local date: December 14, 557
- Magnitude: 6.4 M
- Epicenter: 41.03°N 28.95°E
- Fault: North Anatolian Fault
- Areas affected: Byzantine Empire
- Max. intensity: MMI X (Extreme)

The 557 Constantinople earthquake took place on the night of December 14. This earthquake, described in the works of Agathias, John Malalas, and Theophanes the Confessor, caused great damage to Constantinople, then capital of the Byzantine Empire, in a region frequently afflicted with earthquakes. More minor quakes had preceded the large event, including two in April and October respectively. The main quake in December was of unparalleled ferocity, and "almost completely razed" the city. It caused damage to the Hagia Sophia which contributed to the collapse of its dome the next year, as well as damaging the walls of Constantinople to the extent that Hun invaders were able to penetrate it with ease the following season.

== Tectonic setting ==
The site of Constantinople lies on the northern shore of the Sea of Marmara, which is a pull-apart basin related to active faulting on a series of segments of the North Anatolian Fault, the boundary between the Anatolian Plate and the Eurasian plate. The fault zone accommodates approximately 24 mm per year of dextral (right lateral) displacement along this boundary and has been responsible for many destructive historical earthquakes, such as those in 1509 and 1766.

== Prior events ==
Earthquakes were relatively frequent during the reign of Justinian I (r. 527–565). An earthquake in November 533 had led a crowd to seek refuge at the Forum of Constantine, but there were no real casualties. Minor earthquakes were also reported in 540–541, 545, 547, 551 and 554–555.

There were two precursors to the major earthquake of 557. On 16 April 557, the first earthquake of the year had shaken the city. It caused no real damage. On 19 October 557, the second earthquake struck, with a similar lack of damage.

== Events ==
The third and major earthquake struck in December. According to Agathias, Constantinople was "almost completely razed to the ground" by the earthquake. He describes it as unparalleled in magnitude and duration. He notes that it took place during the celebrations of the Brumalia (the Festival of Names), shortly before the winter solstice and the entry of the Sun to the sign of the Capricorn. He also describes the city as affected by a severe winter prior to the earthquake.

Tremors started towards midnight, when most residents of Constantinople were sleeping. The tremors awoke the citizens and as the buildings trembled, "shrieks and lamentations could be heard". The successive tremors were accompanied by thunder-like sounds from the ground. The air reportedly "grew dim with the vaporous exhalations of a smoky haze rising from an unknown source, and gleamed with a dull radiance".

Panicked residents fled their homes and gathered in the streets and alleyways. Agathias observed that the city had very few “wide open spaces entirely free of obstructions,” meaning that even outdoors people were not safe from falling debris. A shower of sleet soaked those outside and everyone "suffered greatly from the cold". Many sought refuge within the churches of the city.

Agathias notes that disorder reigned. A great number of women, both the low-born and the noble, were in the streets. Men and women "mingled freely", an event unusual in itself. Few paid attention to rank and privilege in the rush to avoid injury. Slaves, for example, paid no attention to the orders of their masters.

The district of Rhegium, close to the port of Constantinople, suffered the greatest loss of houses. Many other buildings were demolished or suffered structural damage. Agathias notes that "large numbers of ordinary people" perished, while Anatolius was the only casualty among the high-ranking in society.

By dawn, the earthquake had ceased. The overjoyed people started seeking those nearest and dearest to them, "kissing and embracing and weeping with delight and surprise".

== Aftermath ==
The dome of the Hagia Sophia was weakened in the earthquake and collapsed completely in May 558. The walls of Constantinople were severely damaged. In early 559, attacking Huns managed to pass through damaged areas of the Walls. Various other churches and buildings were damaged.

Justinian I started a short period of mourning. He did not wear his crown for the forty days following the earthquake. The earthquake was later commemorated by an annual liturgy of supplication. Agathias also claimed there was a short-lived effect on the attitude of the population: the wealthy were motivated to charity, doubters were motivated to pray, and the vicious were motivated to virtue, all in an apparent effort of propitiation. Agathias reports that soon enough everyone lapsed into their former attitudes.

== See also ==
- List of earthquakes in Turkey
- List of historical earthquakes
