= Alois Provazník =

Czech composer and musical pedagogue (1856–1938)

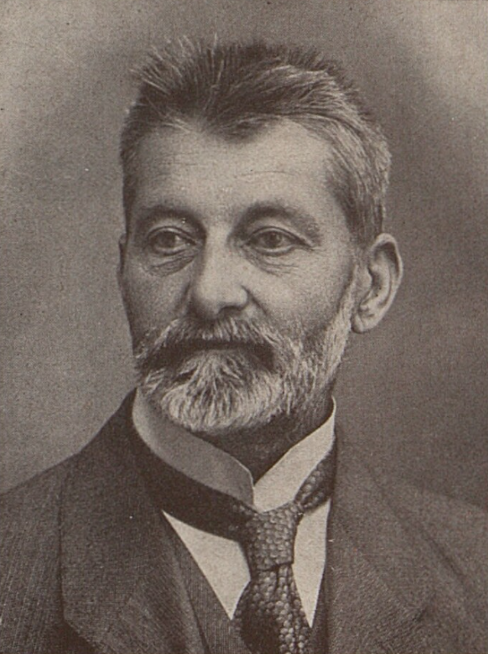
Alois Provazník

Alois Provazník (January 9, 1856 in Prague – January 31, 1938 in Rychnov nad Kněžnou) was a Czech composer and musical pedagogue.

During 1867–1870 Provazník was a singer at the Church of St. Margaret in the Břevnov Monastery, obtaining a basic musical and literary education there (his teacher was a well-known composer Bolard) Later, Provazník studied organ music at a music school in Prague. From 1882 he served as the director of organ choir in Blatná, and from 1886 at the same position in Rychnov nad Kněžnou. For twenty years he taught singing at the gymnasium in Rychnov nad Kněžnou and until 1926 he led the local singing club "Dalibor". His son, Anatol Provazník, was an organist and a composer.

== Selected works ==
Provazník wrote many musical pieces, both chamber and popular music.

Sacred music

- Improperia, Op. 37
- Sedm slov Kristových (Seven Words of Christ), Op. 27
- Stabat Mater, Op. 31
