= Alex Anatole =

Taoist priest

- Born: Moscow, Soviet Union (now in Russia)
- Occupations: Taoist priest, teacher, and writer

Alex Anatole (born in Moscow, USSR) is a Taoist priest, teacher, and writer. He directs centers of Taoist studies in Europe, Australia and the U.S.

== Life and career ==
Grandmaster Alex Anatole was born in Moscow, USSR. Immigrating to the United States in 1976, he began teaching the physical elements of traditional Taoism, including internal/external qigong and meditation.

== Temple of Original Simplicity ==
In 1978 Grandmaster Alex Anatole founded the Center of Traditional Taoist Studies (originally The New England Center of Tao) near Boston. He established close ties to established temples in Shanghai, China.

The temple houses a wide collection of Taoist Deities, as well as, perhaps, the only Hall of Celestial Foxes (Chinese: Huxian, Japanese: kitsune, Korean: kumiho) in the United States.

The temple offers traditional Taoist teachings including the philosophical teachings of the Tao Te Ching, meditation, qigong, as well as the esoteric disciplines of The Celestial Fox Creed.

== Bibliography ==
- The Truth of Tao (Center for Traditional Taoist Studies, Weston, Massachusetts, 2005), an analysis and application of the Taoist philosophy to life in the western world.
- The Essence of Tao (Center for Traditional Taoist Studies, Weston, Massachusetts, 2009) A lineage master's interpretation of the core chapters of the Tao Te Ching.
- The Tao of Celestial Foxes-The Way to Immortality Vol. I, II, III (Center for Traditional Taoist Studies, Weston, Massachusetts, 2015, 2016, 2017) A Fox Master's explanation of the Fox Creed.
- A Synopsis of Taoist Teachings for the West (Center for Traditional Taoist Studies, Weston, Massachusetts, 2019)
