= Anatol Pikas =

Swedish psychologist

Anatol Pikas (29 November 1928 - 1 November 2021), creator of the Shared Concern method, SCm, was an associate professor in Educational Psychology from Uppsala University, Sweden.

Pikas was born in Viljandi, Estonia, and raised in Norrköping in Sweden. He has been a visiting professor in Peace Education in Heidelberg, at the University of Alberta, Edmonton, and at Gustavus Adolphus College in Minnesota, USA.

In the 1960s Pikas’ fields of teaching and research included cognitive psychology and in the 1970s Peace Education. Since the 1980s, Pikas has been developing his Shared Concern method, SCm, originally aimed at dealing with cases of bullying and hazing when they occur in high school.

More recently, SCm has been used as a basis for Peer Mediation and treating youth violence and gang activity in cases where therapeutic mediation can be applied. SCm is presented in a class discussion: not to seek guilt but a shared solution.

The students are asked to write the names of "those who need help". Private discussions start with those mentioned which reveal the names of the suspected bullies are revealed. First in private and later in group discussion a shared resolution with their probable victim is prepared. If this is considered to be acceptable by the therapeutic mediator, the probable victim is invited and a shared solution obtained. If this is in accordance with the norms of the school, the case is considered to be solved but a surveillance continued until satisfactory co-operation is secured. The method requires effective administering and is often required by counsellors as a sustainable solution to it all.

== Published works ==
The following is a partial list of published works by Dr. Pikas:

- Gemensamt Bekymmer metoden. Handbok för ett paradigmskifte i behandling av skolmobbning (1998)
- Så bekämpar vi mobbning i skolan (1987)
- Rationell konfliktlösning, translated into 5 languages (1973)
- Abstraction and concept formation(1996). Harvard University Press
