= Anatol Dumitraș =

- Born: November 14, 1955; Larga, Briceni District, Moldavian Soviet Socialist Republic, USSR
- Died: June 14, 2016 (aged 60) Bucharest, Romania
- Genres: easy listening
- Occupation: Musician
- Years active: 1982–2016
- Formerly of: Bucuria; Legenda; Plai (1986–1989); Olymp (1989–1991); Alai (1991–1993); Filarmonica Națională „Serghei Lunchevici”

Anatol Dumitraș (14 November 1955 – 14 June 2016) was a Moldovan easy-listening singer.

== Biography ==
Anatol Dumitras was born on 14 November 1955, in the Soviet Union, in the commune of Larga, Bricene District .

He Studied at the Technical school nr. 1 of Cernăuți.

His music career started in the 1982, as a soloist in the group "Bucuria". After, in 1983, he sang for the band "Legenda". From 1986 to 1889, he was a soloist in the band "Plai"

Starting in 1993, Dumitraș was a soloist of the National Philharmonic 'Serghei Lunchevici'. From 1989 until 1991 he was the soloist and artistic director of the band ‘Olymp’, and then between 1991 and 1994 he was the soloist and artistic director of the band ‘Alai’. He has many recordings with the National Radio and Television of Chișinău.

In 1995 he received the honorific title Maestru în Artă al Republicii Moldova (Maestro in Art of the Republic of Moldova). He later received in 2012 the honorific title of Artist Al Poporului (Artist of the people).

In December 2012 his final concert was held at the National Palace "Nicolae Sulac" (Palatul Național „Nicolae Sulac”,) on the occasion of his 30th anniversary of him being a performer.

Toward the end of July 2015, the press reported that he was seriously ill, The information proved to be true: Dumitraș was hospitalized at a clinic in Bucharest, with his wife by his side.

On 20 August 2015, a concert was organized at the National Philharmonic "Serghei Lunchevici" (Filarmonica Națională „Serghei Lunchevici”), where performers such as Ion Suruceanu, Natalia Barbu, Anișoara Puică, Zinaida Julea, and others sang. The money collected from ticket sales was donated to Anatolie Dumitraș.

Dumitraș passed away on the morning of 14 June 2016 in Bucharest, at the age of 60, after battling cancer. He was buried at the Central Cemetery in Chișinău (Cimitirul Central din Chișinău), as a applauded and well remembered artist. During the more than three decades of his career, Anatol Dumitraș released five albums and held concerts in 57 countries.

== Notable songs ==
- Prima dragoste
- Libertate (interpretă Angela Bucico)
- Flori de liliac (interpretă Ana Barbu)
- Dulce-i vinul
- Polițist
- Roata vieții
- Ploaia despărțirii
- Mîndra mea
- Mercedes
- O inima nu mă lăsa

== Discography ==
- Sus paharul (2000)
- Ultima seară (2003)
- Azi la masa mare (2005)
- Anii mei, destinul meu (2007)
- Roata vieții (2008)
