= Anatolius (curator) =

Anatolius (Greek: Ανατόλιος; died 14 December 557) was a Byzantine official, active in the reign of Justinian I (r. 527–565). He held the titles of curator domus divinae and honorary consul. He was killed in the Constantinople earthquake of 557.

== Biography ==
According to Agathias, Anatolius was responsible for the care (administration) of the houses and lands owned by the emperor Justinian I (Greek: έπιμέλειαν τῶν βασιλέως οίκων τε καί κτημάτων). His rank is given as curator and equal to a consul. This would make him a curator domus divinae (administrator of the private property of the imperial family) and honorary consul. The latter title means that Anatolius was a member of the Byzantine Senate with the rank of vir illustris.

He was unpopular because of his conduct. He claimed the goods of many wealthy houses, under the pretext of collecting what was due to the emperor. This allowed him to ignore the terms specified in the wills of recently deceased owners. The seized property fell under his control as a curator. Agathias implies that Anatolius added parts of the seized property to his own estate.

Anatolius probably became one of the wealthiest men of his time. His private residence in Constantinople is described decorated with marble, a material quite expensive. The decorative material's role was to exhibit the wealth and refined taste of the residence's owner. "Adorned with a variety of marble plaques attached to the wall, of the kind that are lavishly and ostentatiously displayed by those who are inordinately fond of such superfluous and unnecessary bric-à-brac."

On 14 December 557, Constantinople was hit by a great earthquake. The date is estimated based on the accounts of John Malalas and Theophanes the Confessor. Anatolius was killed by a falling piece of marble, evidently within his own residence. "Anatolius was sleeping at the time in his customary bedchamber. ... One of these [marble] plaques, which was fastened to the wall next to the bed, was shaken loose from its fittings and wrenched off by the violence of the tremors. It came down with all its weight on his head, and smashed his skull. He had barely enough time to utter a deep and muffled groan of pain and then sank back on his bed. Death had overtaken him."

Agathias notes that Anatolius was the only high-ranking individual to perish in the disaster. He notes contemporary belief that Anatolius had been punished for the injustice of his conduct.

Agathias himself doubted that the death of Anatolius was an instance of divine judgment: "I doubt it, for an earthquake would be a most desirable and excellent thing if it knew how to discriminate the bad from the good, slaying those and passing these by. But, even granting that he [Anatolius] was unjust, there were many more like him and worse, who escaped unharmed."

== Sources ==
- Frendo, Joseph D., ed. (1975), Agathias: The Histories, Berlin and New York: Walter de Gruyter, ISBN 978-3-11-003357-1
- Bury, John Bagnell (1889), History of the Later Roman Empire from Arcadius to Irene, Volume 1, Courier Dover Publications, ISBN 978-1-60520-404-8
- Martindale, John R., ed. (1992). The Prosopography of the Later Roman Empire: Volume III, AD 527–641. Cambridge: Cambridge University Press. ISBN 0-521-20160-8.
