= Anatol Perepadia =

Ukrainian translator

Anatol Oleksiyovych Perepadia
- Анатоль Олексійович Перепадя
- Born: August 23, 1935; Popelak, Kherson region
- Died: June 7, 2008 (aged 72); Kyiv, Ukraine
- Citizenship: Ukraine
- Education: Taras Shevchenko University
- Occupation: Translator

Anatol Oleksiyovych Perepadia (Ukrainian: Анатоль Олексійович Перепадя; August 23, 1935 – June 7, 2008) was a Ukrainian translator from Romance languages.

== Biography ==
Anatol Perepadia was born on August 23, 1935 in the village of Popelak, Sivasky district, Kherson region, in teachers family, Oleksa Petrovych, his father, was a mathematician, Efrosinia Mykhailivna, his mother, was a biologist. Parents taught in villages, often moving from one place to another. He finished the ten year school in Oleksandria, Kirovohrad region.

He graduated from Taras Shevchenko University in Kyiv. Perepadia began reading European literature in Polish or Czech as a student, although he did not study those languages. He said that at the journalism faculty where he studied, they did not want to give a satisfactory score in French. Over time, he began to become proficient in Romance languages.

For two years Perepadia worked in the Sumy region, and then for twelve years in Kyiv publishing houses, such as Dnipro Publishing House and Veselka. His last working place was the "Veselka" publishing house, where on September 8, 1971, on the eighth volume translating Maupassant he left his favorite job. He collaborated with Vsesvit magazine as a reader of foreign news, reviewer, consultant and editor. In the most difficult time, from 1973 to 1987, he remained at creative work thanks to the existence of the Kyiv Writers' Committee.

He started publishing poetry in the local newspaper in the 7th grade. He made his debut as a translator in 1963 in Molod with the Michel Duino's novel Pharaoh Seekers.

He translated into Ukrainian from most Romance languages - French, Italian, Spanish, Portuguese, Catalan. He was the first translator to complete a full Ukrainian translation of In Search of Lost Time by Marcel Proust and Gargantua and Pantagruel by 16th-century author François Rabelais.

At the beginning of June 2008, Perepadia got into road accident in Kyiv. After two days in a coma, he died on June 7, 2008.

== Awards ==
- Two-time laureate of "Skovoroda" award, which is awarded by the French Embassy for the best translation carried out within the framework of the program of the same name.
- Laureate of the Perm "Ars Translationis" prize for the translation of the Portuguese novel by Jorge Amado The Great Trap.
- Knight of the French Order of Arts and Letters and Knight of the Order of Academic Palms.
- Laureate of the M. Zerov French-Ukrainian prize.
