= Anatoli =

Suburb of Ioannina, Greece

Anatoli Ανατολή
- Municipal unit
- Location within the regional unit

- Location within Greece
- Coordinates: 39°38′N 20°52′E
- Country: Greece
- Administrative region: Epirus
- Regional unit: Ioannina
- Municipality: Ioannina
- City established: 1924 (102 years ago)

Area
  - Municipal unit: 15.845 km^{2} (6.118 sq mi)
  - Community: 7.698 km^{2} (2.972 sq mi)
- Elevation: 490 m (1,610 ft)

Population (2021)
  - Municipal unit: 12,119
  - Municipal unit density: 764.85/km^{2} (1,980.9/sq mi)
  - Community: 10,379
  - Community density: 1,348/km^{2} (3,492/sq mi)
- Time zone: UTC+2 (EET)
  - Summer (DST): UTC+3 (EEST)
- Vehicle registration: ΙΝ

Anatoli (Greek: Ανατολή, romanized: Anatolí) is a town and a former municipality in the Ioannina regional unit of Epirus, Greece. It is located within the urban area of Ioannina and since the 2011 local government reform it is part of the municipality of Ioannina, of which it is a municipal unit. The municipal unit has an area of 15.845 km^{2} and the community of 7.698 km^{2}. It has a population of 12,119 according to the 2021 census. Anatoli was established in 1924 by Greek refugees from Anatolia, who were relocated there after the population exchange between Greece and Turkey.
