= Anatolio Scifoni =

Italian painter (1841–1884)

Anatolio Scifoni (2 May 1841 – 1884) was an Italian painter of mainly genre paintings.

== Biography ==
He was born in Florence as the son of the painter I. Botti and the poet Luigi Scifoni. He studied painting first in the Albertina Academy in Turin, then in Paris, and then moved to Rome, where he became a friend and follower of Lorenzo Delleani. In 1860, at Turin, he exhibited his first painting: La spigolatrice di Sapri. By 1865, at Milan, he exhibited the small genre canvas Convalescenza e sanità.

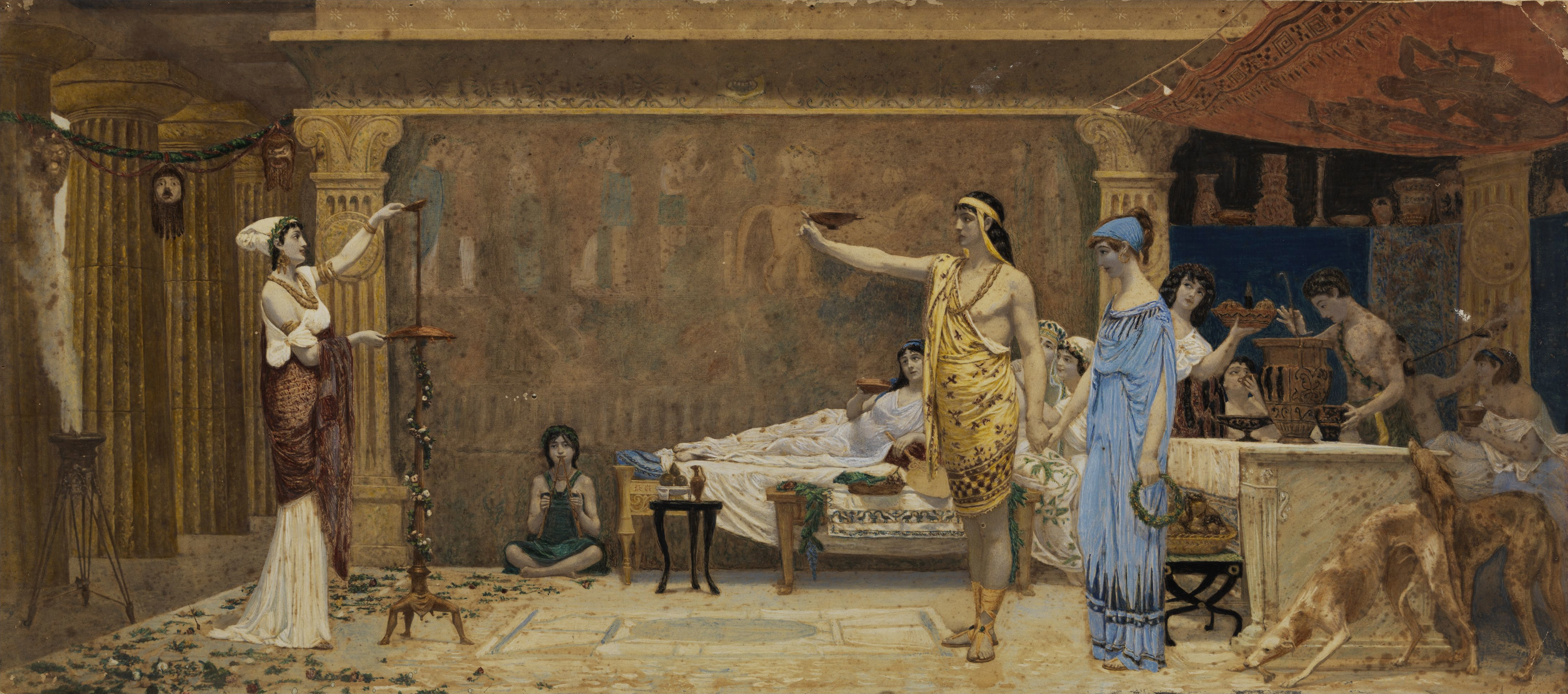
Cottabo. Mixed media on cardboard, 24,5 x 55 cm

Once he moved to Rome, he focused on Neo-Pompeian themes from ancient Greece and Rome. He called his works archaeological paintings. He painted baths, gardens, triclinia (an antique Roman dining room), and ginecei (women's quarters in Ancient Greece. He spent months among the silent ruins of Pompei, where he imagined girls in fanciful pursuits, provocative and sensual matrons outside in gardens or orchards, or strolling under elaborate arches, or on cushions in aristocratic and mysterious cubiculi.

He exhibits his paintings (almost all small) in Rome, in Monaco, in Philadelphia, in Vienna, in the Salon of Paris, and in the Royal Academy at London. Among his many canvases are: Le bolle di sapone (The Soap Bubble), bought by Mattia Montecchi (Venice); Il recinto dei paroni sacri a Giunone (The enclosure of the peacocks sacred to Juno, 1867, Florence), acquired by baron Koller of Baden; Una offerta ai Dei Lari (An offer to the Lares or Household Gods), awarded a medal at Philadelphia and acquired by James Abbott; Cleopatra consults a Seer (1870, exposition of the Società Amatori e Cultori, Rome, acquired by the Mr Garnee of New York); A Dance Lesson in Pompei, acquired by Mr Fipping of Sevenoaks, England; La missione della Croce, awarded at the Expositions of Vienna, acquired by baroness Schickler (Paris); La vigilia del matrimonio a Pompei (The Marriage Vigil), acquired by Mr. How (New York); The Fountain of Mercury in Pompei acquired by Mrs Scudder of Sacramento, California, Il giorno natalizio del padre a Pompei (The Birthday Trip of Father to Pompeii), acquired by Mr Head of San Francisco, California; Tepidarium delle Terme di Pompei, acquired by Goupil Gallery of Paris; La Vestale, acquired by Mr Phillips Phoenix; An offer to Diana of Ephesus, acquired by Mrs M. Graw of Ithaca, New York; Il Cottabo, acquired by Mr Schilizzi of Naples; I Saltimbanchi di Pompei Paresia e Ghieria; Le teresiane a Roma (1869, Genoa); and Frigidarium (1877, Paris Salon, and sold in England). His paintings won first-class medals at Vienna and Philadelphia.

Scifoni's work found patrons among the royal family. He was knighted into the Order of the Crown of Italy. His large canvas of Vittorio Emanuele II in Campidoglio was commissioned by the artist of the prefect of the Royal House, Prince Doria Pamphili, to commemorate the enthronement of the King in Campidoglio, in January 1870.

Scifoni died in 1884 in Rome.
