= Anatolio =

Anatolio is a masculine given name, a rare variant of "Anatoly" or "Anatole". Notable people with the name include:

- Anatolio, Duke of Terracina (10th century), Gaetan ruler
- Anatolio Scifoni (1841–1884), Italian painter
