= Anatol Provazník =

Czech organist and composer (1887–1950)

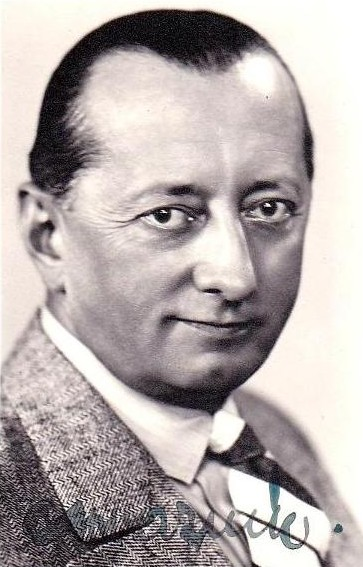
Czech organist and composer Anatol Provazník

Anatol Provazník (10 March 1887 in Rychnov nad Kněžnou – 24 September 1950 in Prague) was a Czech organist and composer.

Anatol Provazník was son of Alois Provazník, a regional composer. He studied at the gymnasium in Rychnov nad Kněžnou and then at the music conservatory in Prague, finishing in 1907. During 1907–1911 he worked as an organist in the St Vitus Cathedral, later he moved to Berlin.

Provazník became very interested in the emerging radio broadcasting. He studied "radiophony" in Berlin and after return to Prague he helped to set up the music department of the Czech Radio. Since 1930 he worked, for sixteen years, as the proxy director of this department. Provazník was a friend with Karel Hašler and other artists.

Provazník is author of about 240 musical works including several operas and five operettas. He also adapted many classical piano and orchestra works to fit in radio broadcasting. These adaptations were performed for long time after his death.

== Selected works ==
Stage

- Akrobat, Comic Opera in 1 act (1928); libretto by Ladislav Novák after Gottfried August Bell
- Ghitta, Opera in 3 acts (1937); libretto by the composer

Orchestral

- Valse des morts (1909)
- Suita z venkova (Country Suite; Suite champêtre; Ländliche Suite), Op. 53 (published 1936)

Concertante

- Concert Fantasy for viola and orchestra, Op.51 (published 1930s)

Chamber music

- Valse joyeuse for violin and piano, Op.137 (published 1924)
- Hindu Song for violin and piano, Op.140 (published 1924)
- Valse triste for violin and piano, Op.142 (published 1924)

"Le faune amoureux" Op143 (published before1916, Josef Weinberger Verlag)fur violon uns klavier "Impromptu"," valse gracieuse","toccata", Op144, for violine uns klavier-josef Weinberger Verlag, before 1916 "Les diablotins" valse, Op85, for violine uns klavier, Josef Weinberger Verlag

Piano

- Ballade en souvenir du grand maître Fr. Chopin: drame passionel, Op.130 (published 1924)
- Valse joyeuse, Op.137 (published 1924)

Vocal

- The Gardener, 3 Songs for voice and piano, Op.131 (published 1925); words by Rabindranath Tagore
- Chinesische Flöte, Lieder for voice and piano, Op.132 (published 1925); words by Li Bai, Seng-ju Wang and Fu Du

Choral

- Cantantibus organis (150. Žalm), Variations for soloists, chorus, organ and orchestra, Op.52 (published 1936)
- Žalm 116 (Psalm 116) for soprano, chorus organ and orchestra, Op.56 (published 1937)
