= 447 Constantinople earthquake =

Earthquake in present-day Turkey

- Location within Marmara
- Local date: 26 January, 6 November, 8 November or 8 December 447
- Local time: Night
- Magnitude: 6.4 M
- Epicenter: 41.008°N 28.978°E
- Areas affected: Bithynia, Thrace, Byzantine Empire
- Max. intensity: MMI IX (Violent)
- Tsunami: yes

The area around Constantinople was affected by a major earthquake in AD 447. It caused serious damage to the recently completed Theodosian walls in Constantinople, destroying 57 towers and large stretches of the walls. The historical records contain no mention of casualties directly associated with this earthquake, although many thousands of people were reported to have died in the aftermath due to starvation and a "noxious smell". At that time, the Attila the Hun were actively threatening the security of the Byzantine Empire's northern border to the Balkan area of Europe; this was not ideal because the city was now vulnerable to attacks. The city recruited around 16,000 people total to rebuild the walls; they rebuilt them in as little as 60 days. The earthquake was reported to be around an 6.4.

== Earthquake ==
There is some uncertainty in the date of this earthquake, with 26 January, 6 November, 8 November and 8 December all being proposed.
