= Savur-Mohyla =

Height near Snizhne

Coordinates: 47°55′22.75″N 38°44′25.94″E

Savur-Mohyla Memorial
- Ukraine
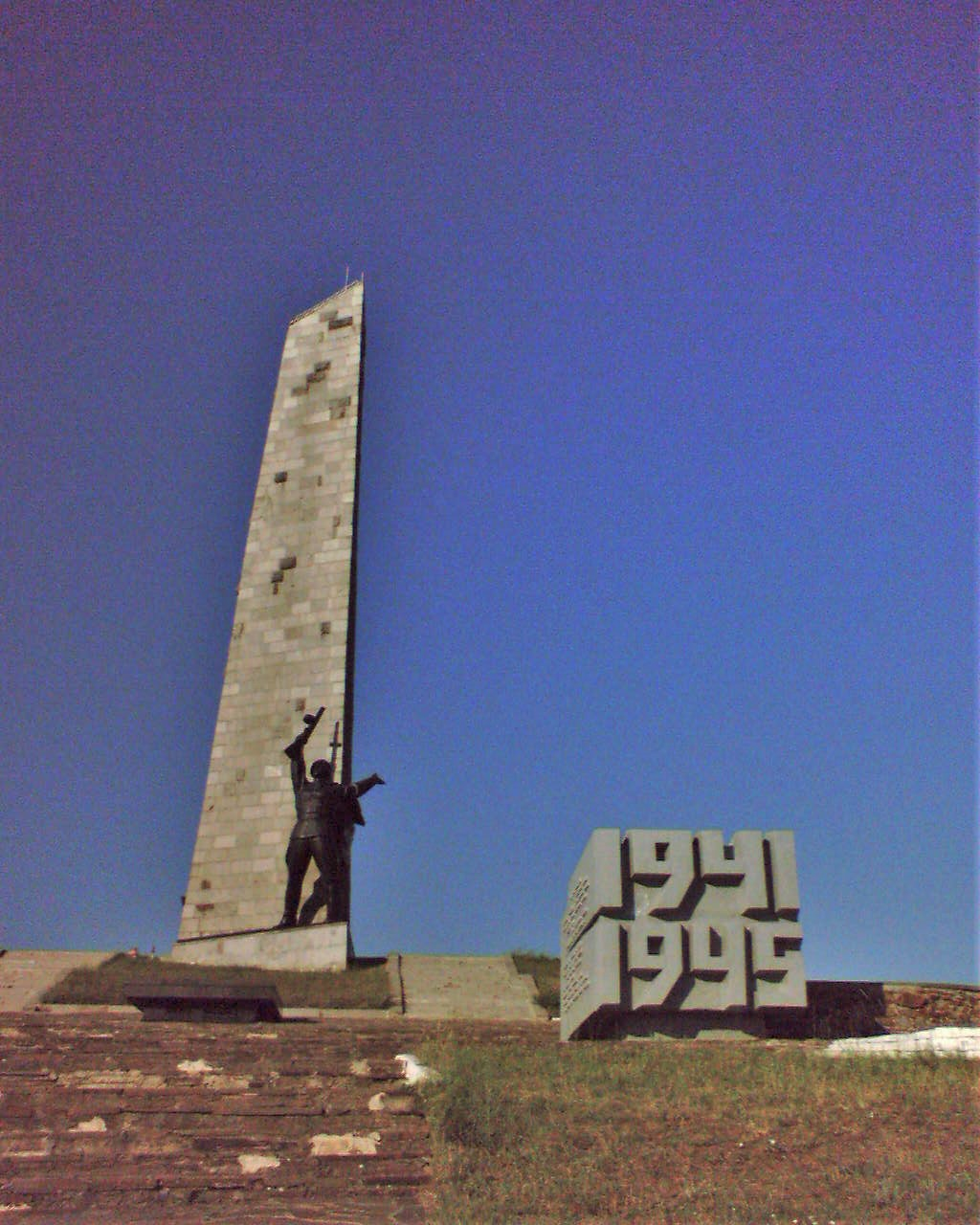
- Savur-Mohyla Memorial, 2008
- For Red Army soldiers fallen during World War II
- Unveiled: 1963
- Location: near Snizhne
- Designed by: Anatoly Ignashchenko

Immovable Monument of National Significance of Ukraine
- Official name: Меморіальний комплекс "Савур-могила" (Savur-Mohyla Memorial Complex)
- Type: History
- Reference no.: 050013-Н

Savur-Mohyla (Ukrainian: Савур-могила), often transliterated using the Russian spelling Saur-Mogila (Russian: Саур-Могила), is a strategic height in the Donets ridge near the city of Snizhne, in Donetsk Oblast, Ukraine.

The 277.9 m (912 ft) tall hill is better known for a big monument complex that was built in 1963 by Ukrainian architect Anatoly Ignashchenko to commemorate the 20th anniversary of the liberation of Savur Mohyla during World War II.

== History ==
It was originally a tumulus (kurgan) – mohyla means "tumulus" in Ukrainian and according to one interpretation the word savur comes from Turkic sauyr, meaning "steppe mound shaped like a horse bottom". Rosamund Bartlett writes, "Many popular legends had been spun about this particular kurgan, which had acted as a kind of frontier between the Russians and the Turks and Tatars in the mediaeval period; Saur appears in them either as an evil Turkish khan or a Cossack hero."

== World War II ==
During World War II, Savur-Mohyla was the focal point of intense fighting, when Soviet troops managed to retake control of the height from German forces in August 1943. In 1963, a memorial complex was unveiled at the top of the hill to honour fallen soldiers, comprising an obelisk with a steel-and-concrete statue of a Soviet soldier, four steel-and-concrete sculptures built along the slope leading up to the obelisk (each memorializing infantrymen, tankmen, artillerymen and airmen involved in the battle), and walls inscrcribed with the names of fallen soldiers in the battle.

== 2014 war in Donbas ==
In 2014, during the first months of the military conflict between Ukrainian troops and Ukrainian Russian backed "Donetsk People's Republic" (DPR) militants in the Donbas, the Savur-Mohyla height was captured by Donetsk People's Republic fighters. On 23 July 2014, Russian Armed Forces shot down two Ukrainian Air Force Sukhoi Su-25 (NATO reporting name "Frogfoot") ground-attack aircraft flying at 17,000 feet (5,200 meters) over Savur-Mohyla, using an advanced anti-aircraft system, 9K37 Buk positioned near Anastasiyevka, Russian Federation.

On 28 July 2014, after intense fighting, the Armed Forces of Ukraine claimed that they recaptured control of Savur-Mohyla from Russian troops. Following its capture by the Ukrainian 25th Airborne Brigade on 9 August 2014, the Russian militants recaptured the hill on 26 August 2014 from the 1 battalion of the 93rd Mechanized Brigade of the Armed Forces of Ukraine. The fighting begun on 24 August 2014 when Russian units crossed the border. During the fighting, the hill changed sides between Ukraine and Russia about 8 times, 3 days after they began attacking, on the 27 August 2014, the Russians defeated the Ukrainian army at the Battle of Ilovaisk.

=== Destruction of the memorial ===
On 21 August 2014, the memorial's obelisk collapsed after enduring weeks of heavy shelling.

=== Reconstruction ===
On 4 September 2022, Russians announced completion of restoration works on the complex with official reopening to occur on 8 September. The memorial now includes monuments dedicated to the war in Donbas, including bass reliefs of Arsen Pavlov, Mikhail Tolstykh, and Vladimir Zhoga.

== Gallery ==
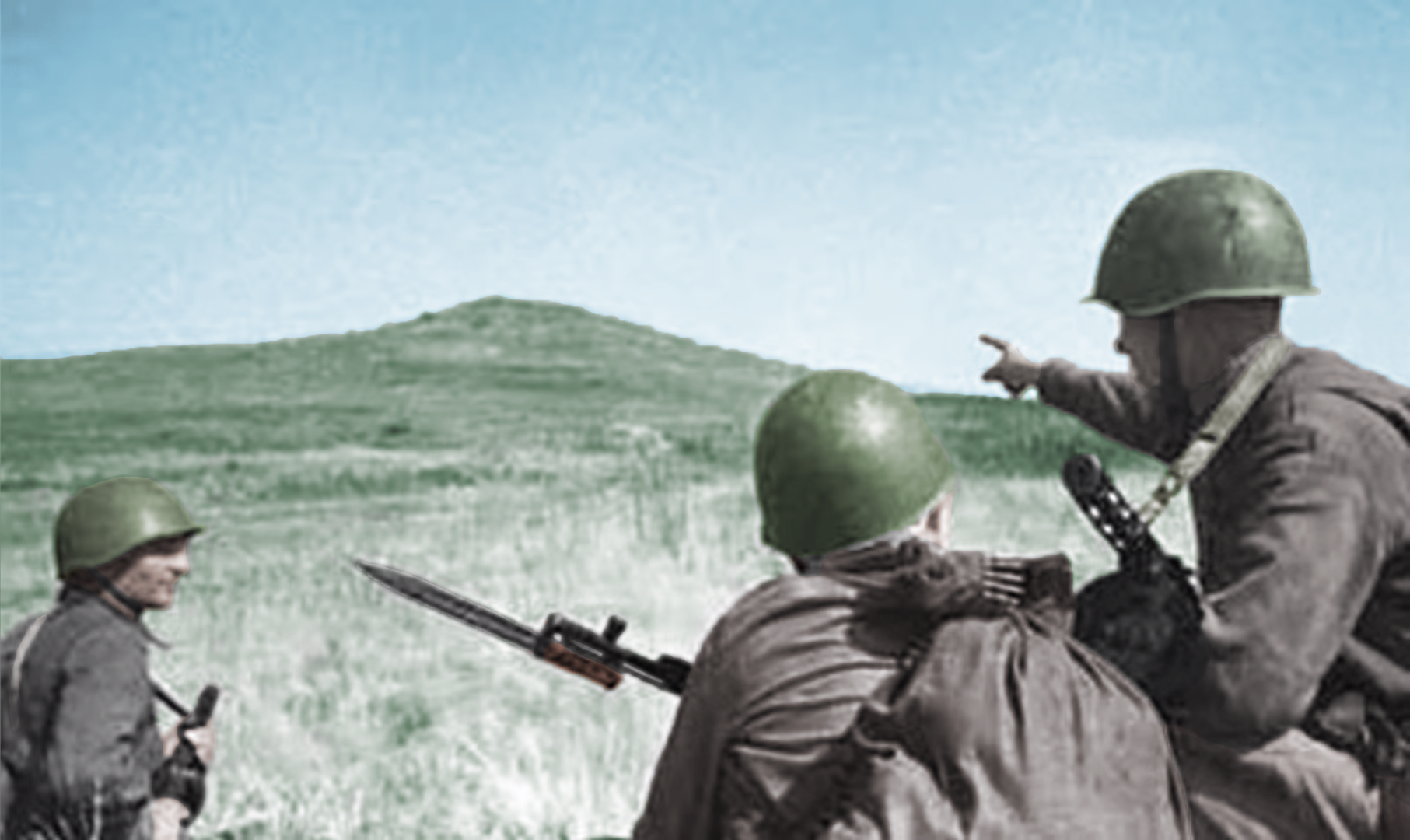
Red Army soldiers near Savur-Mohyla during World War 2

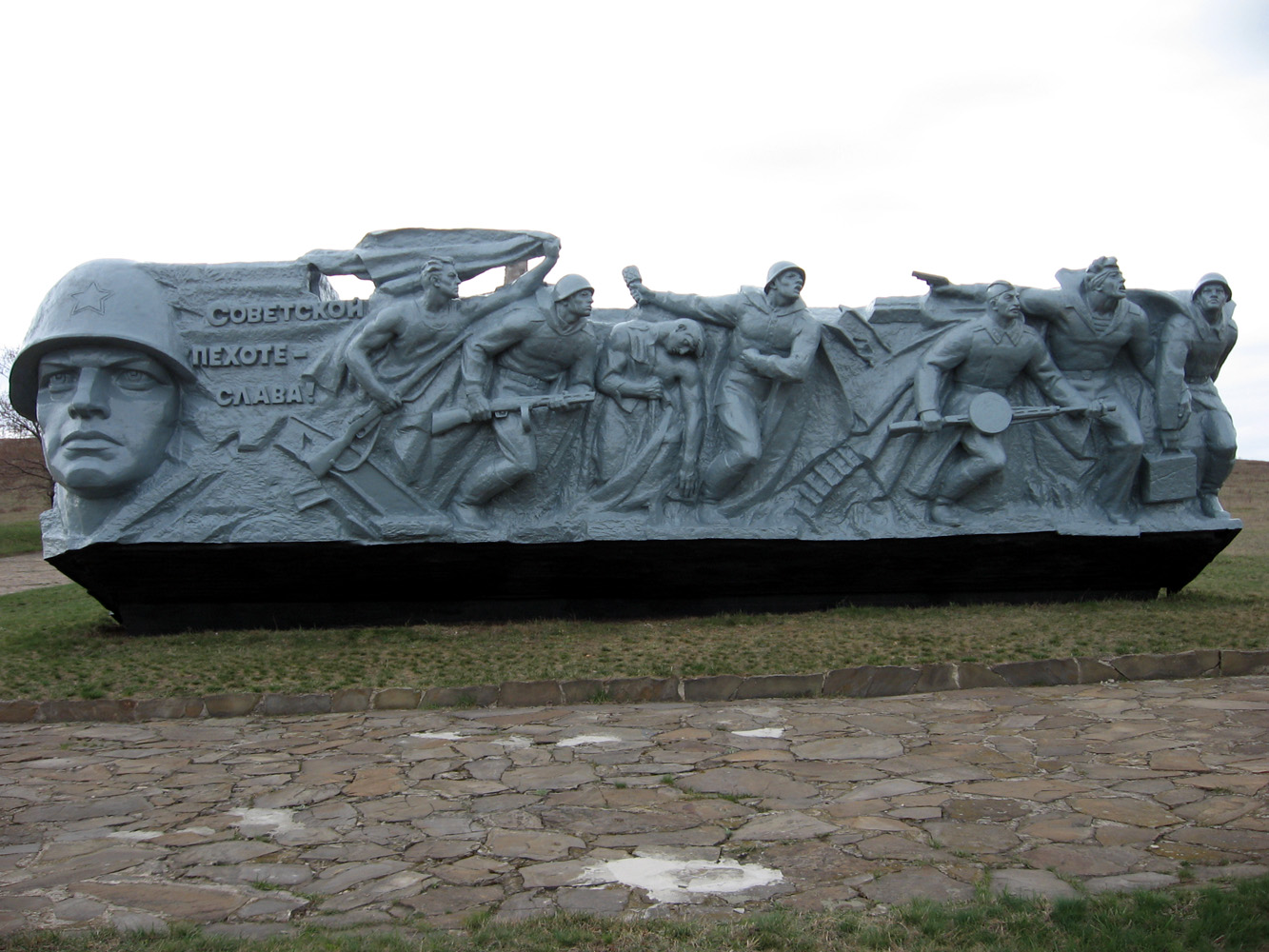
Monument to Soviet infantrymen in World War 2

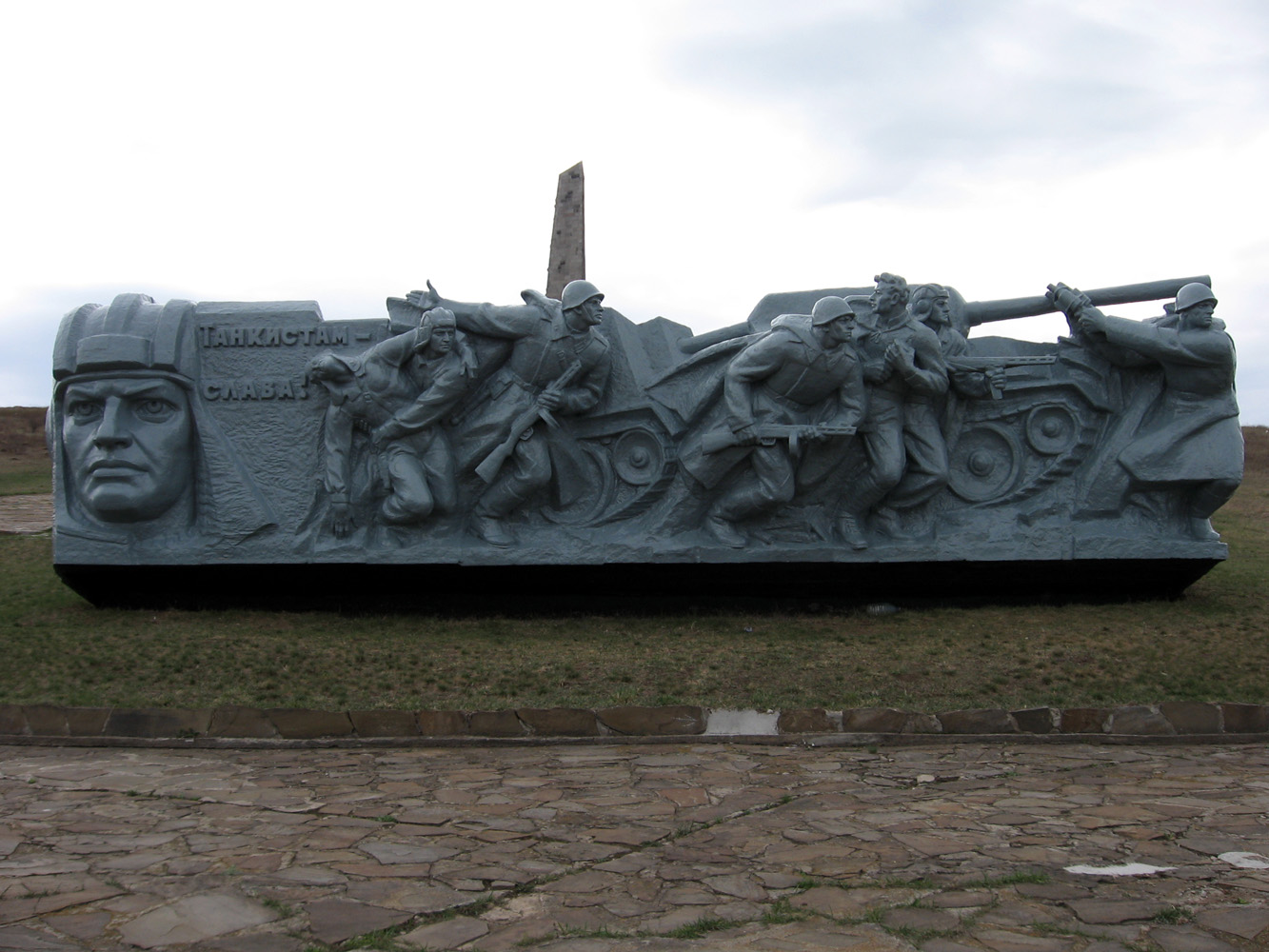
Monument to Soviet tankmen in World War 2

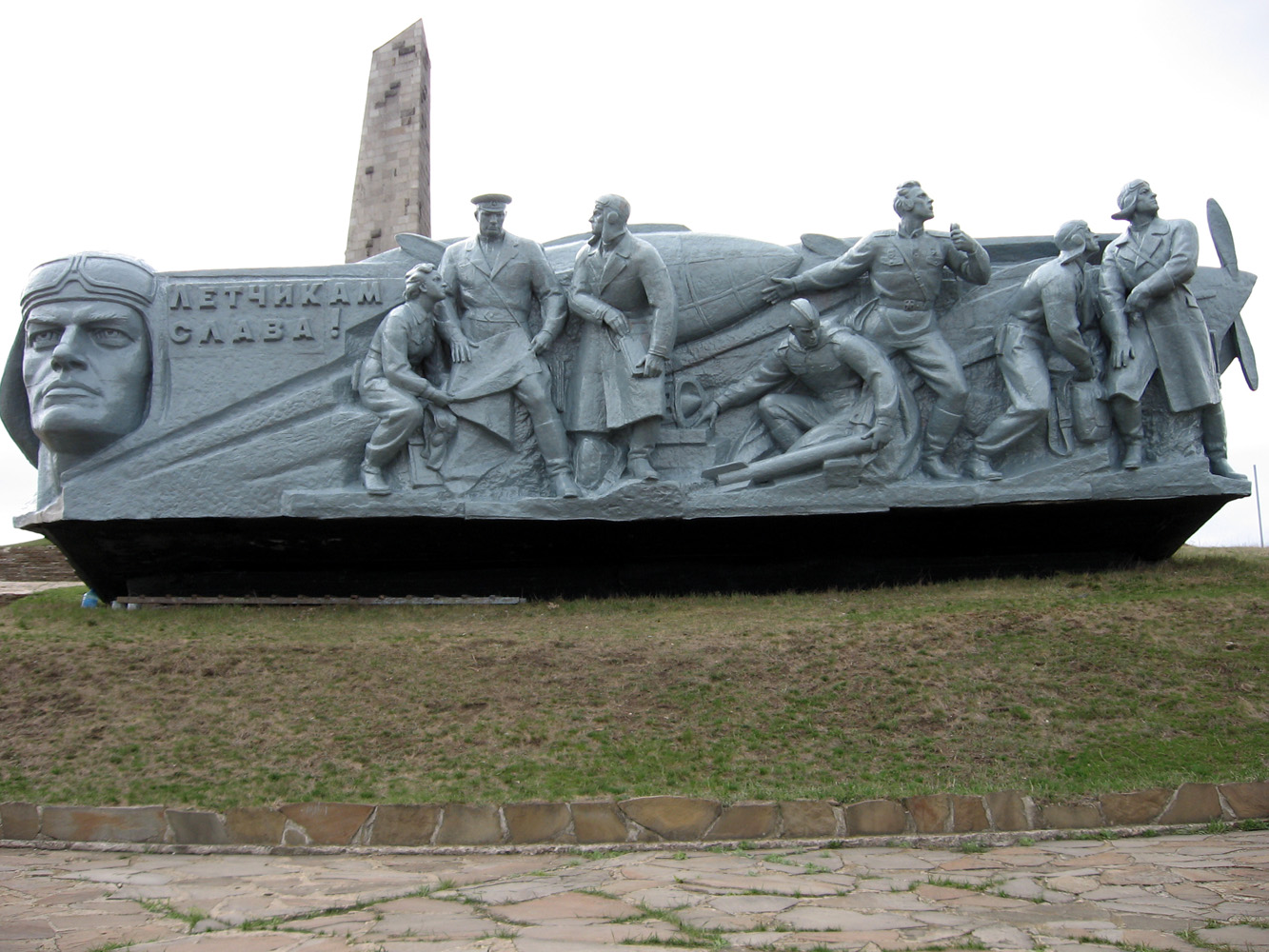
Monument to Soviet pilots in World War 2

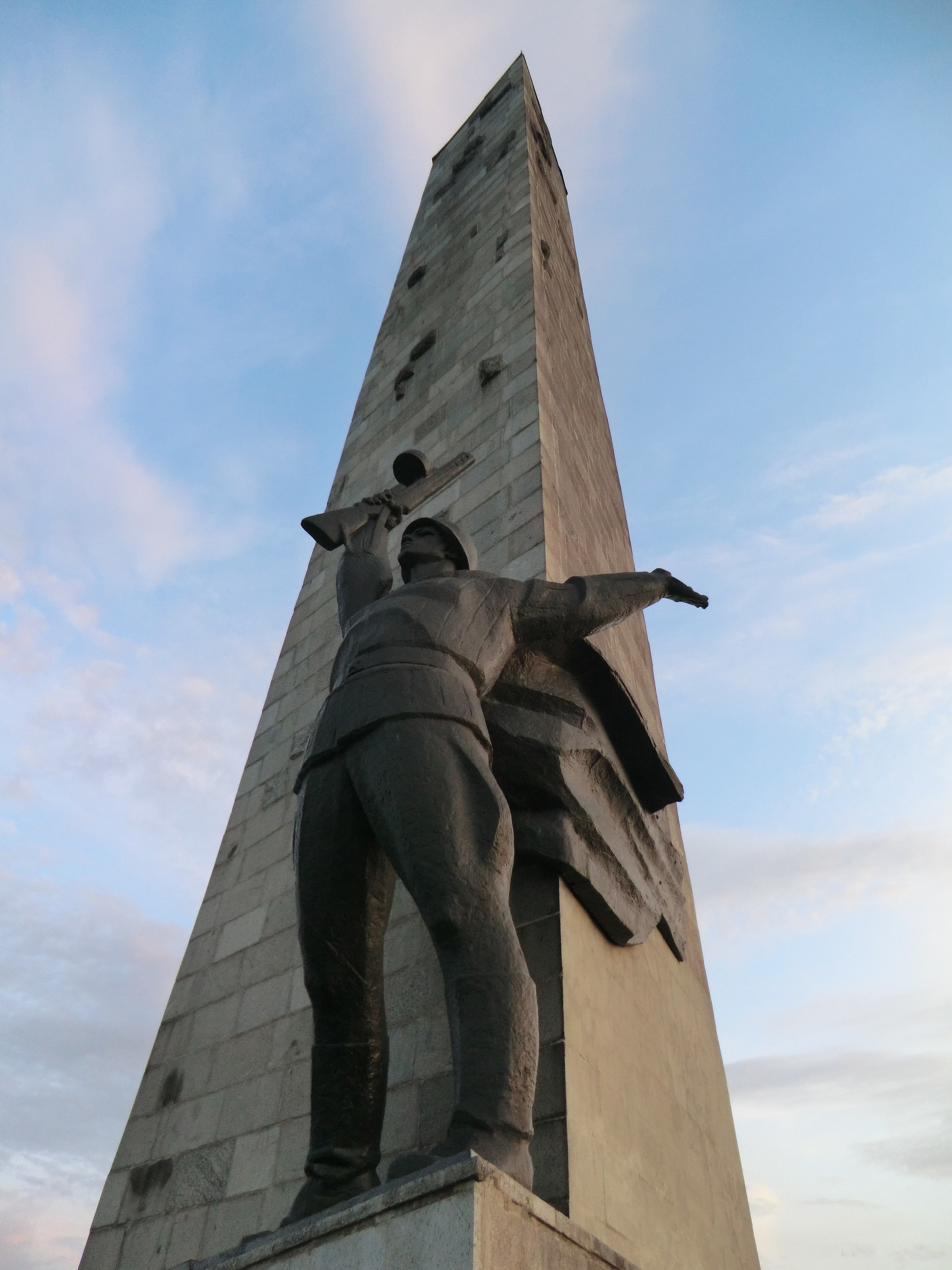
Soviet soldier statue next to the former obelisk

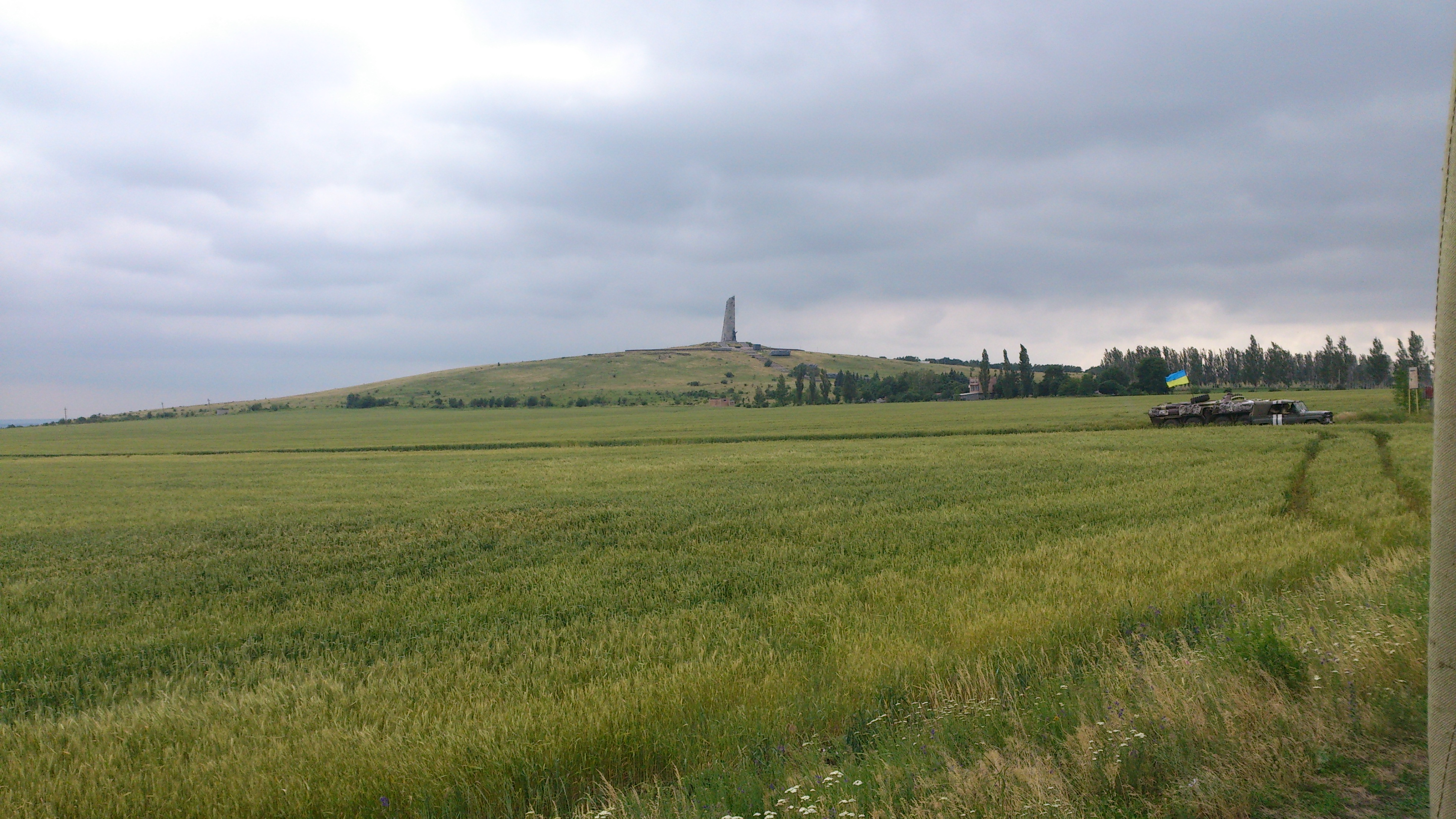
Ukrainian soldiers near the memorial before the Battle of Shakhtarsk Raion in June 2014

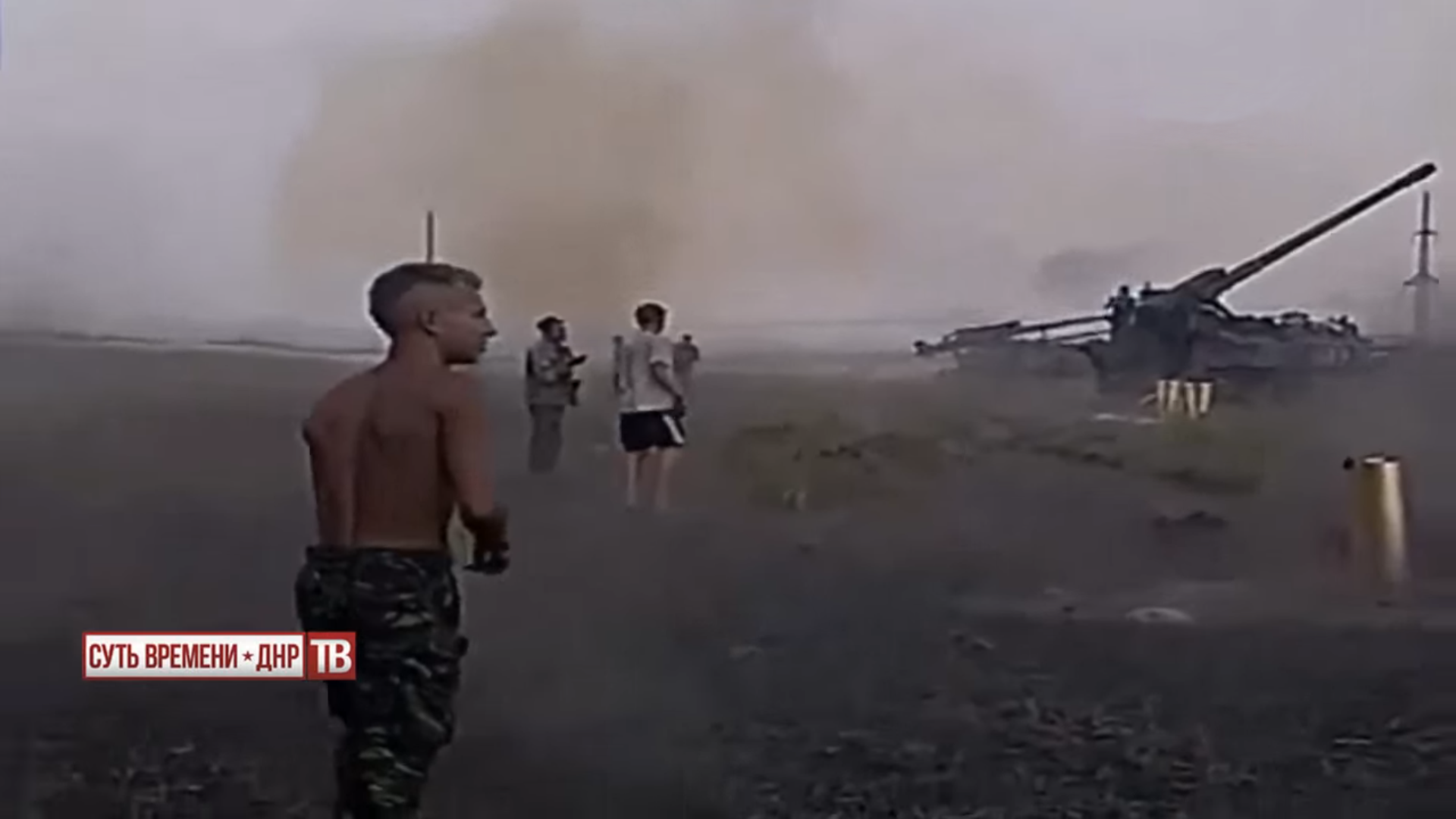
Ukrainian soldiers fire multiple 2S5 Giatsint-S at Russian positions at Savur-Mohyla, July 2014

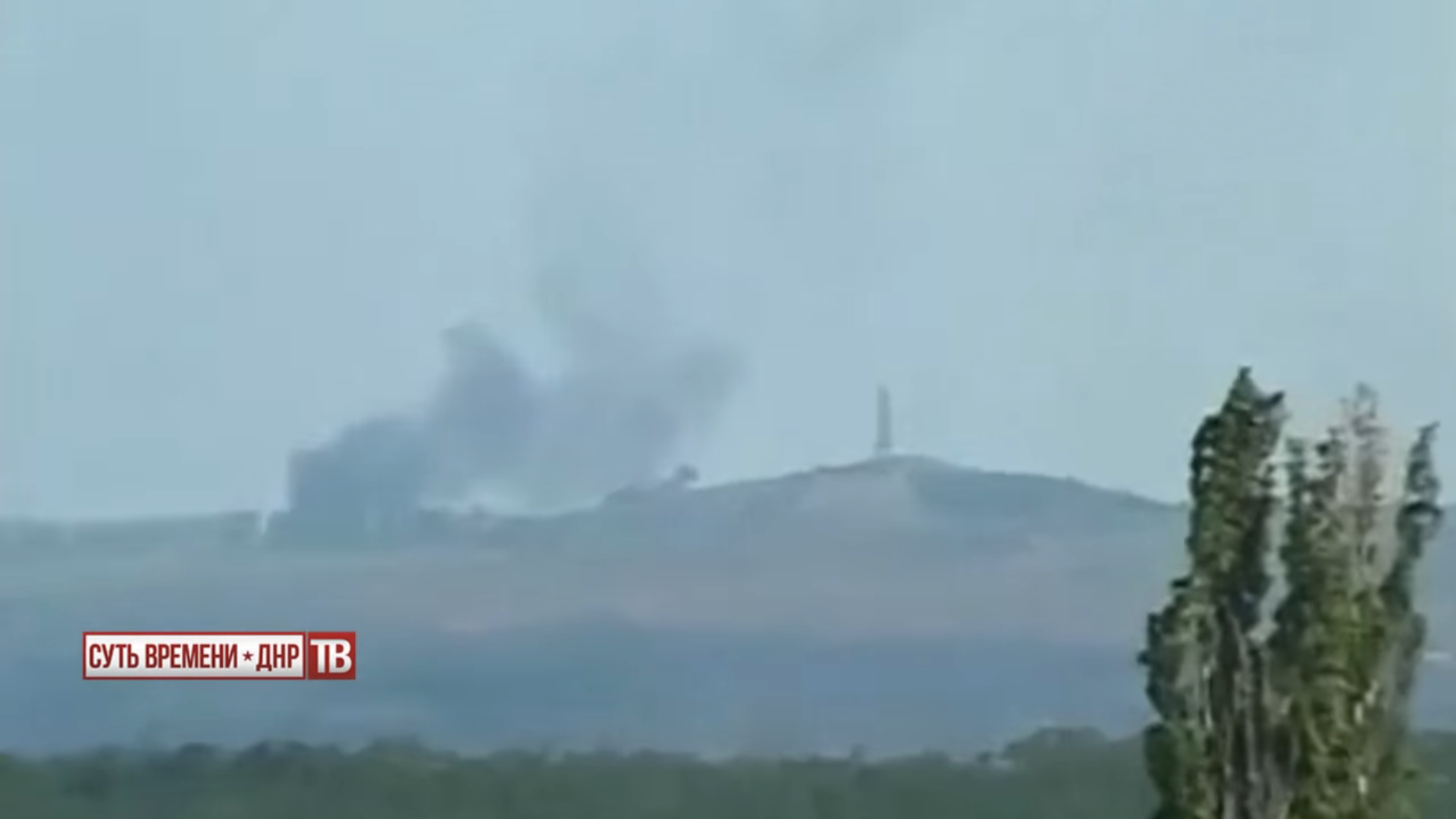
Ukrainian soldiers bombing Russian positions in Savur-Mohyla, July 2014

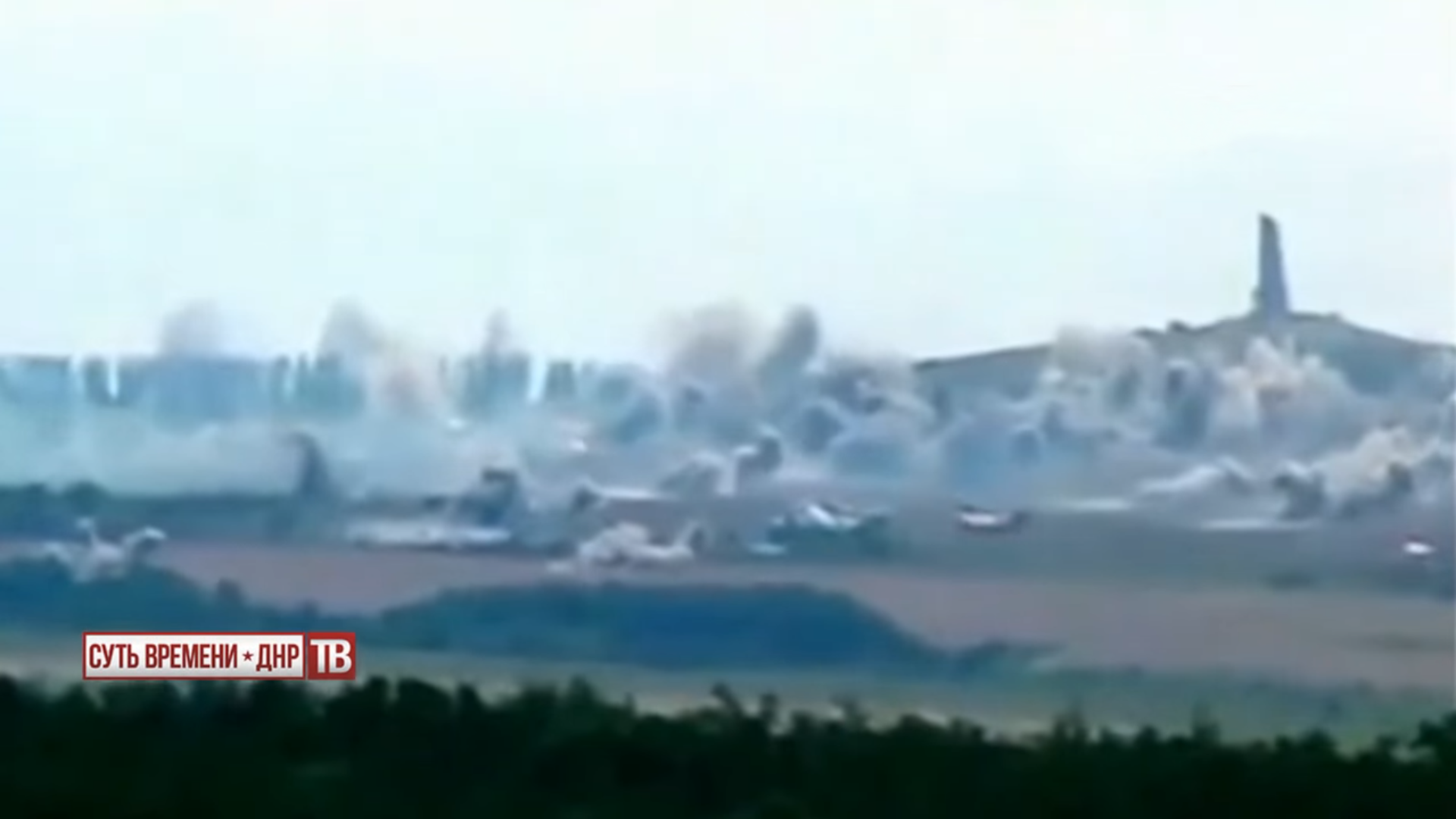
Ukrainian BM-21 rockets exploding at Savur-Mohyla, July 2014

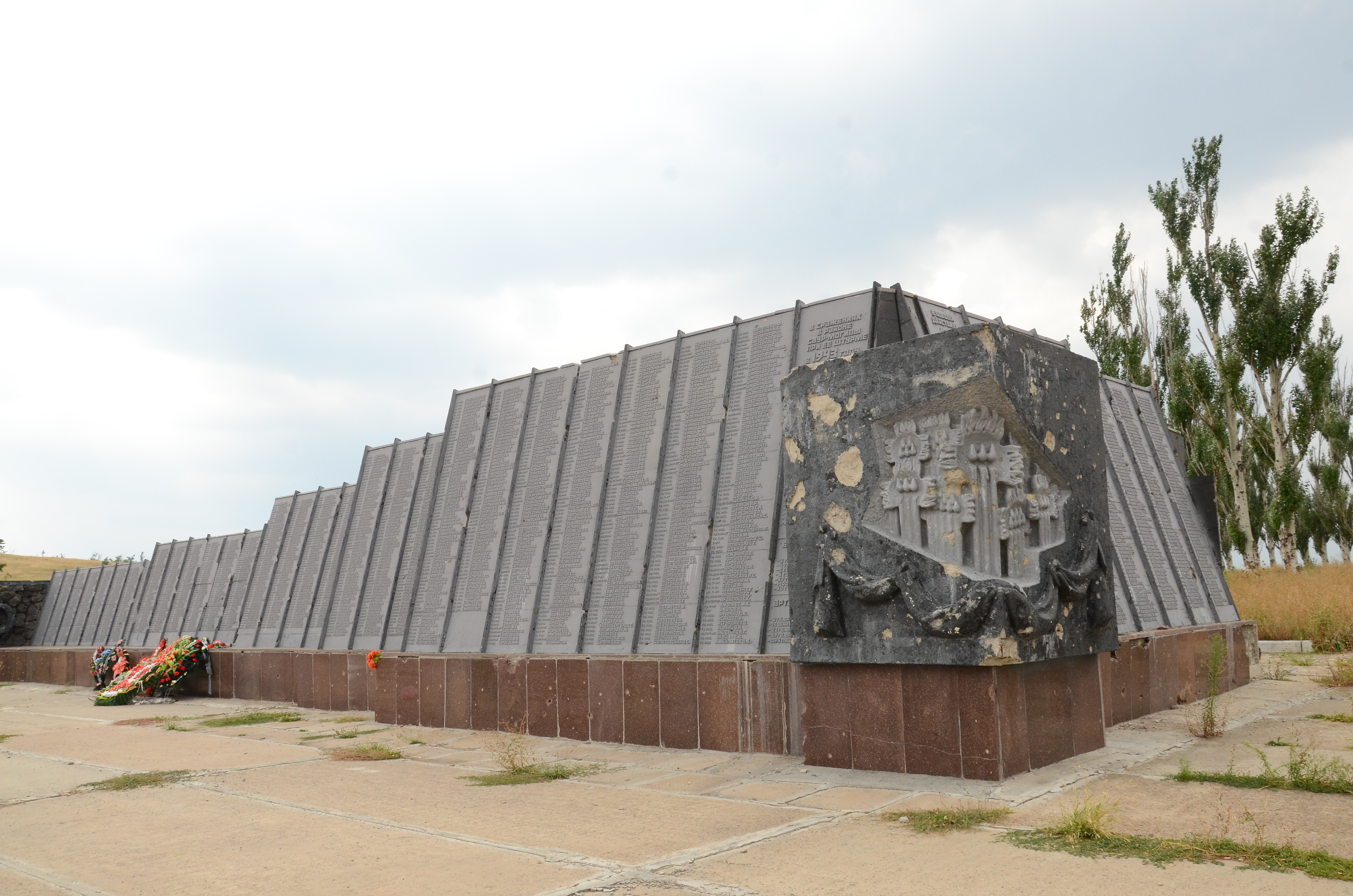
Large memorial to World War 2 Soviet soldiers in August 2015

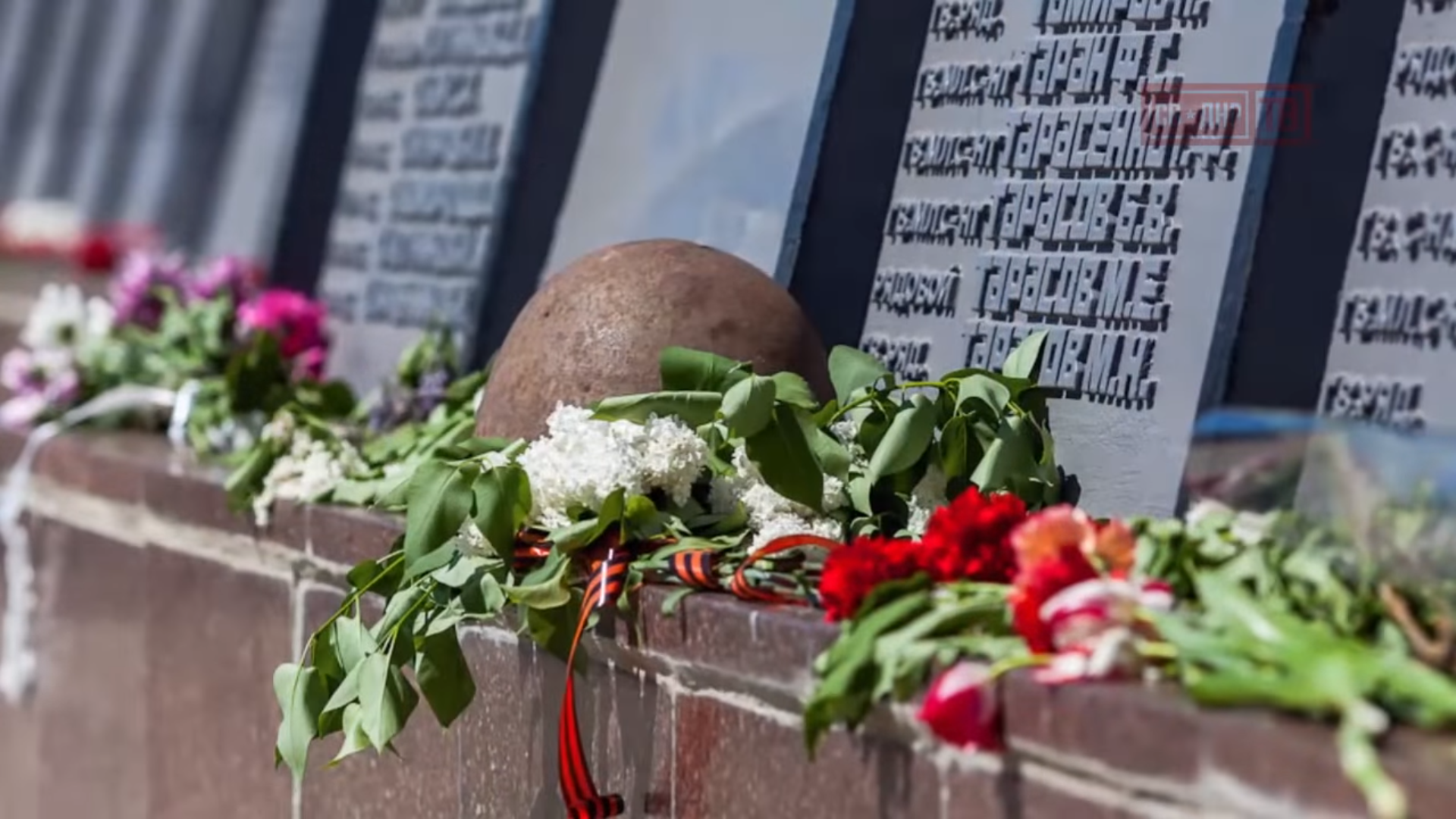
Close-up of the memorial

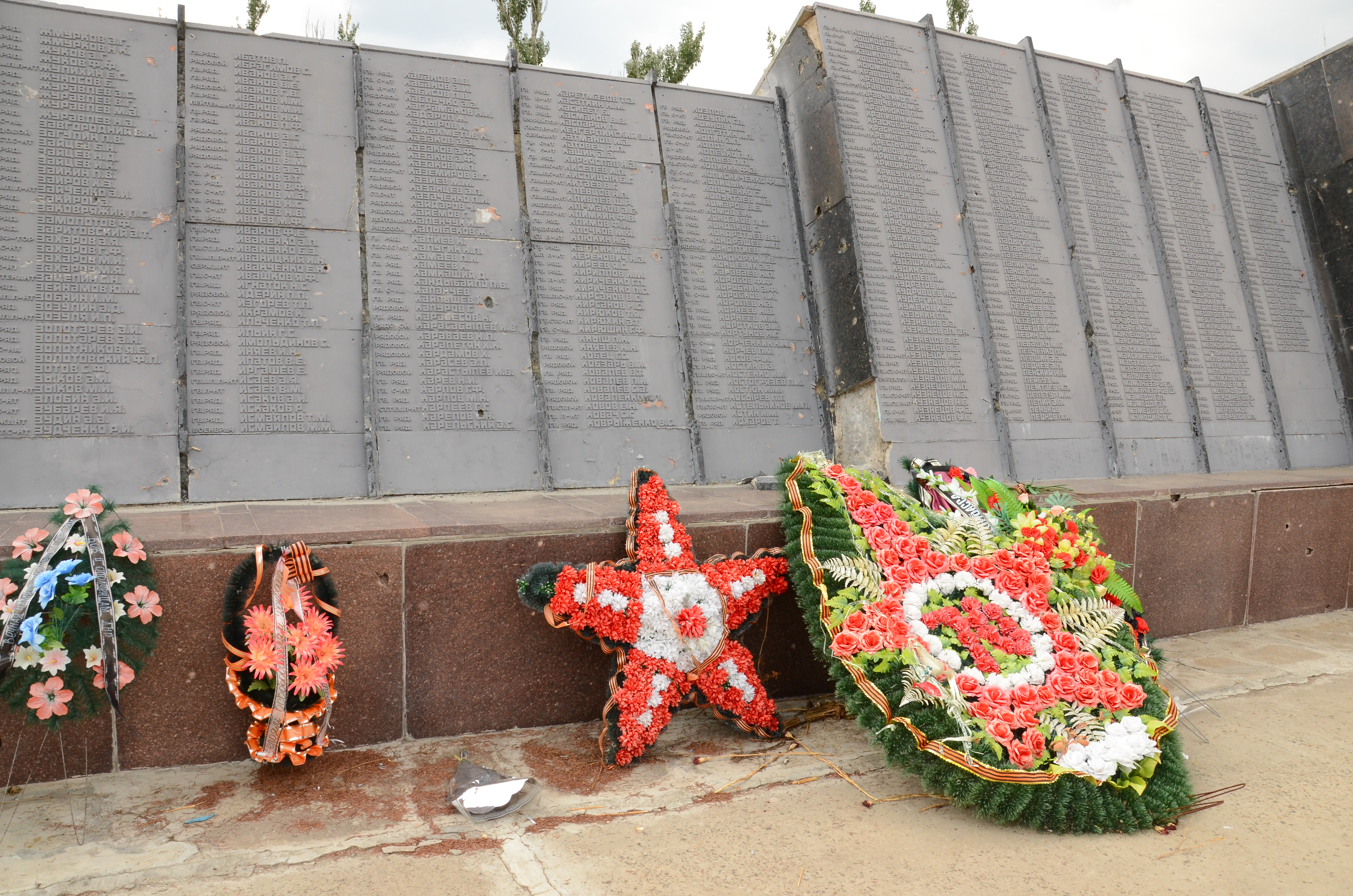
Another view of the memorial

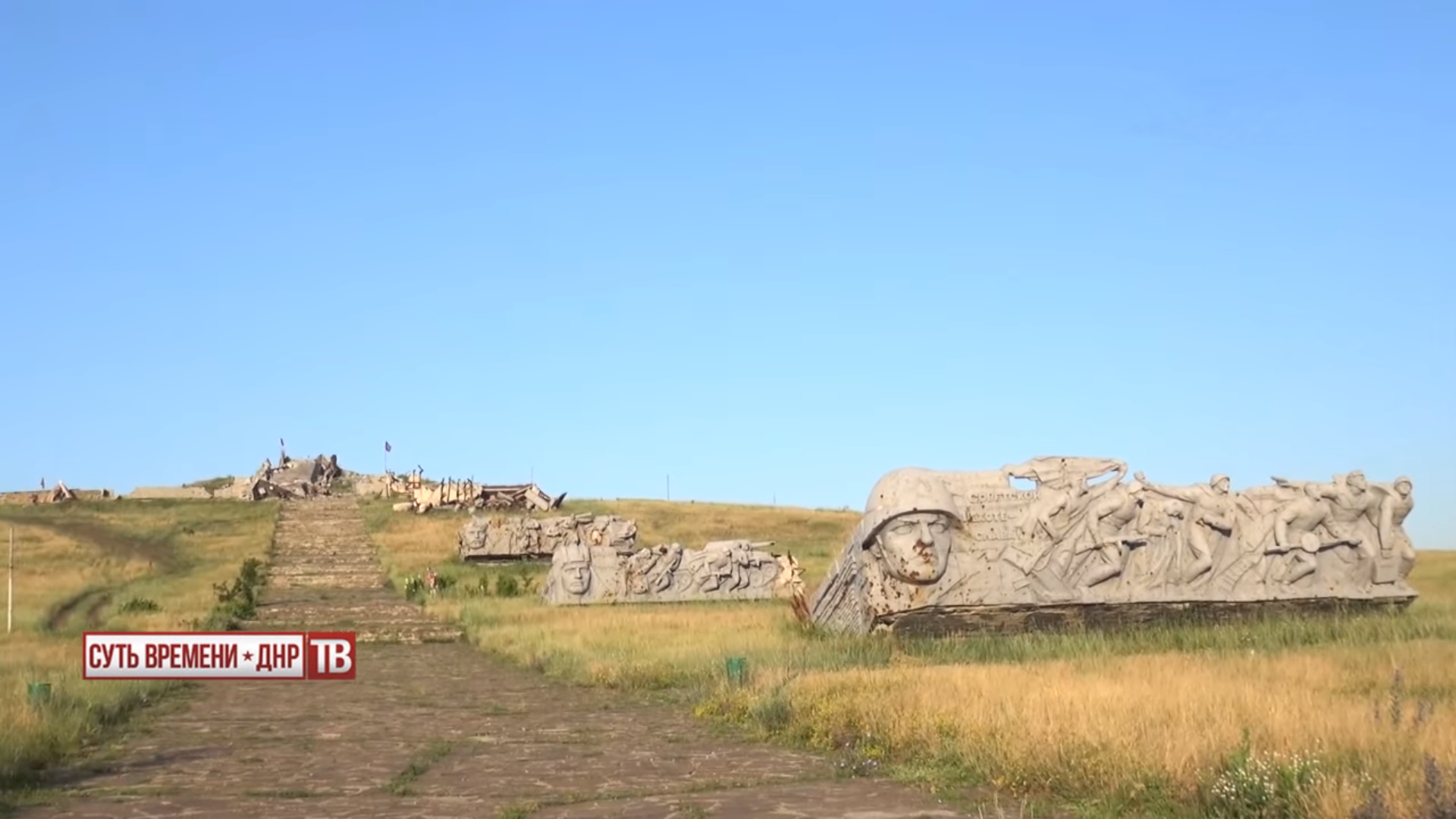
Savur-Mohyla in 2015 with notable damage a year after the war in Donbas battle

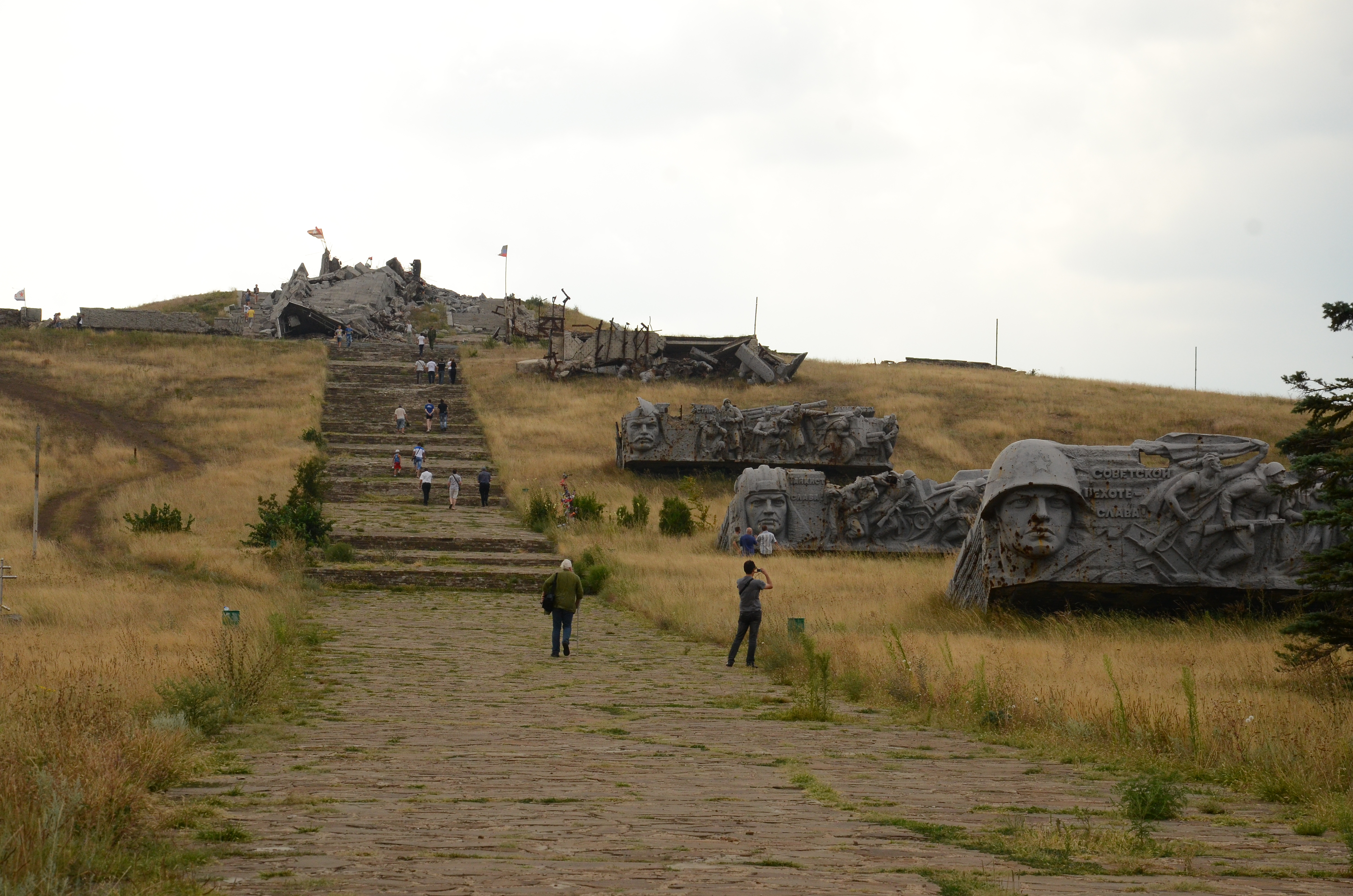
HD view of the path and visitors

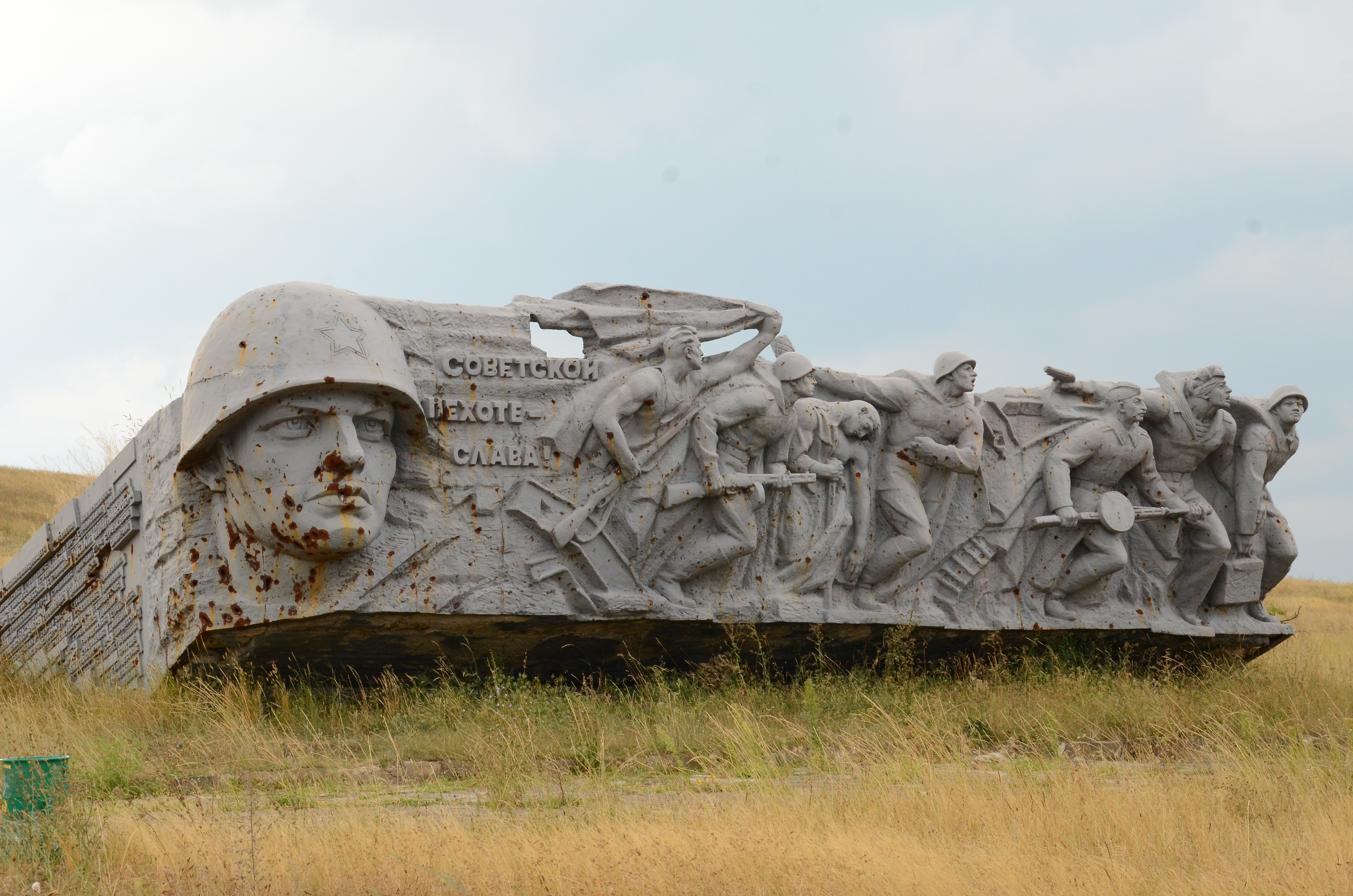
Aftermath of the monument to Soviet infantrymen

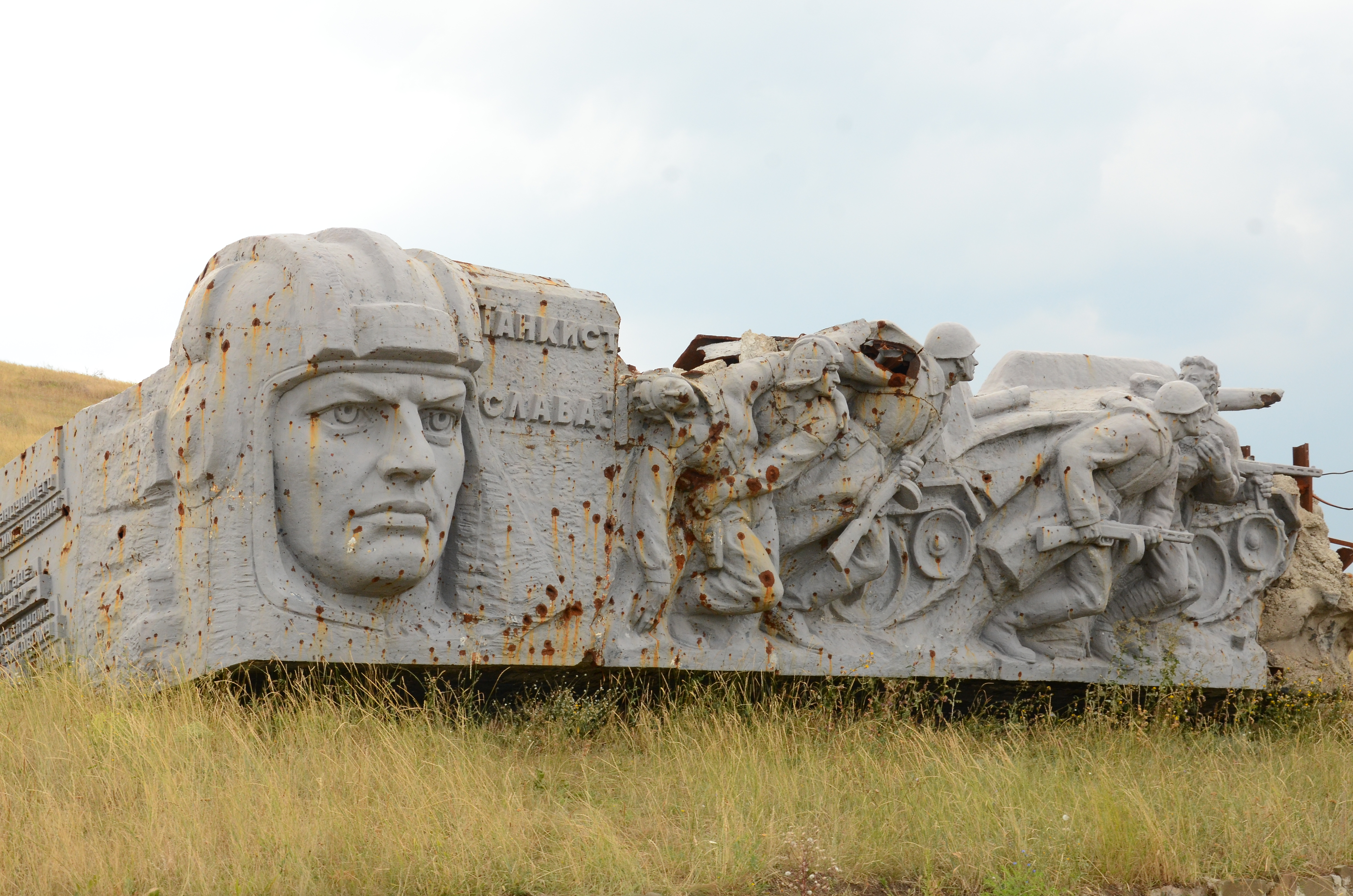
Aftermath of the monument to Soviet tankmen

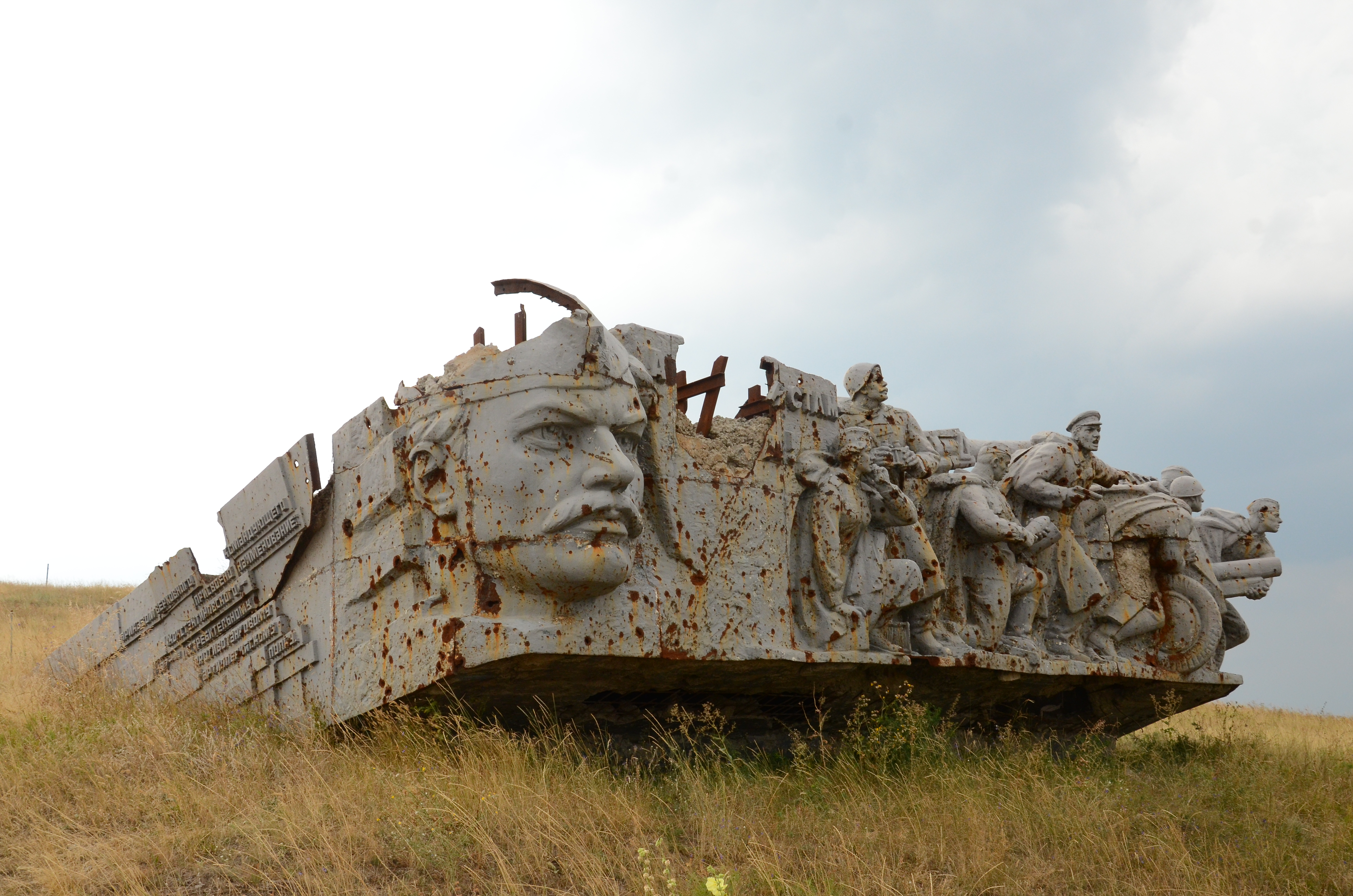
Aftermath of the monument to Soviet artillerymen

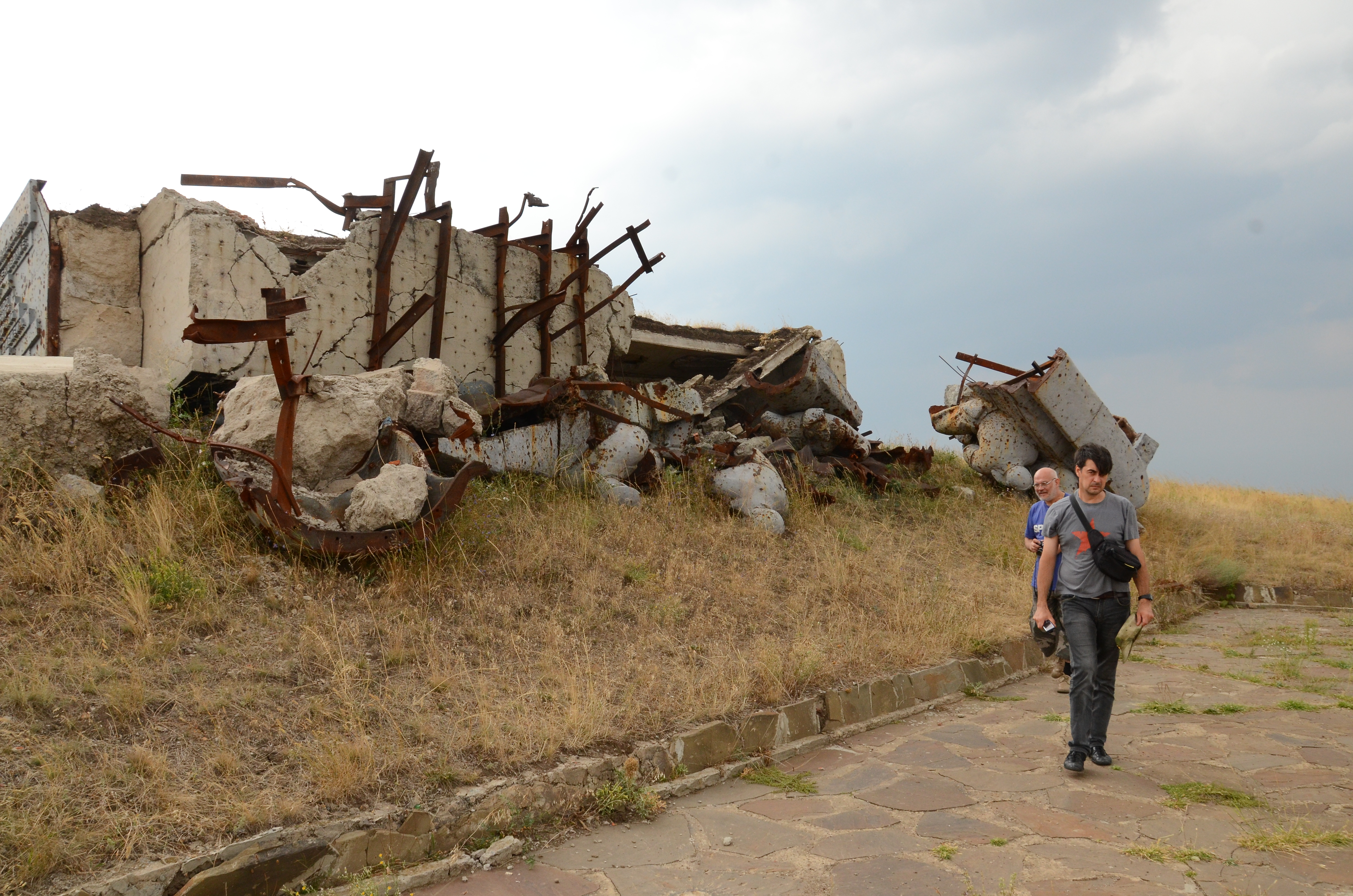
Aftermath of the monument to Soviet pilots

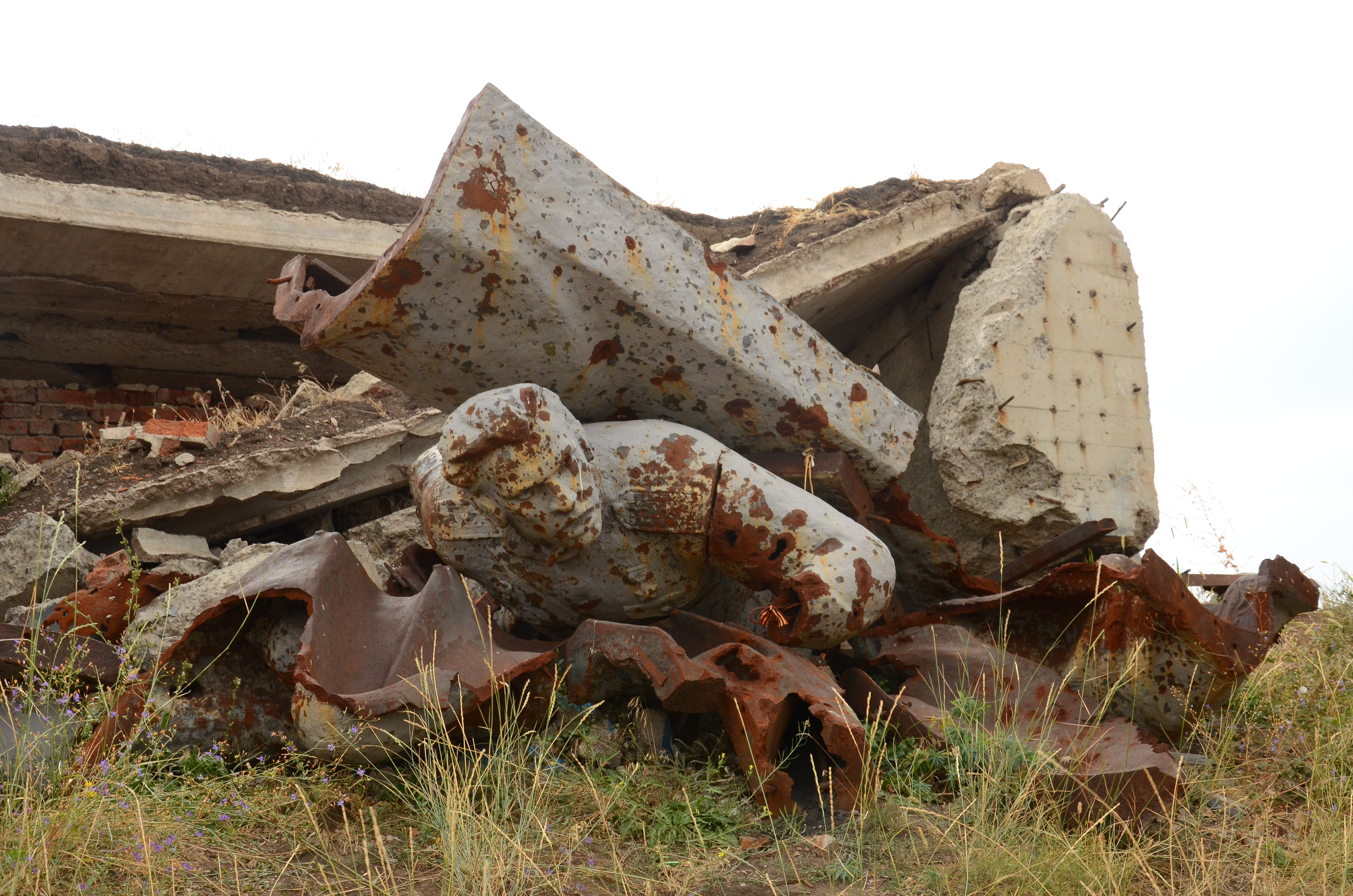
Soviet pilot statue collapsed in front of rubble

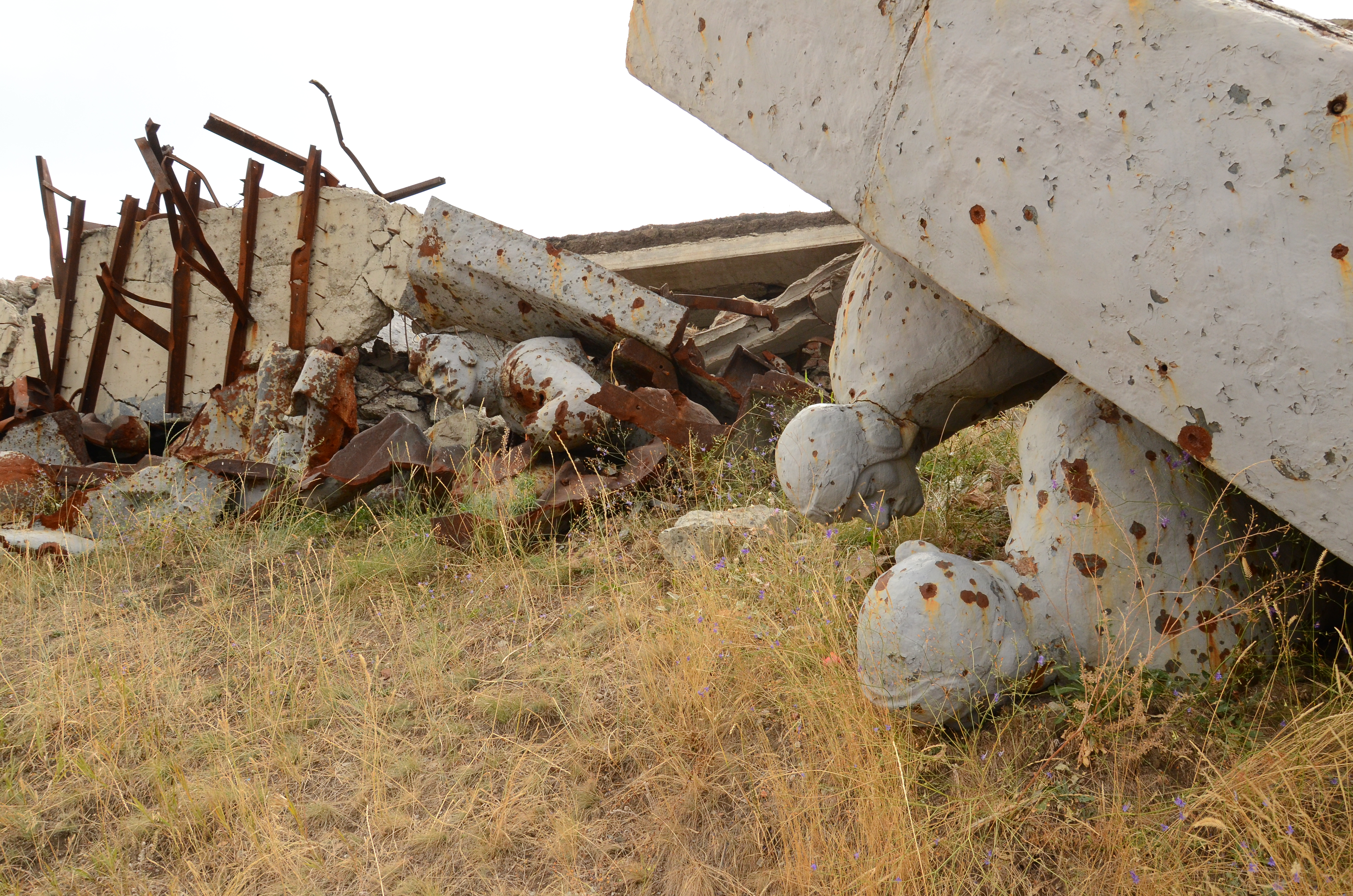
More pilot statues amongst the rubble

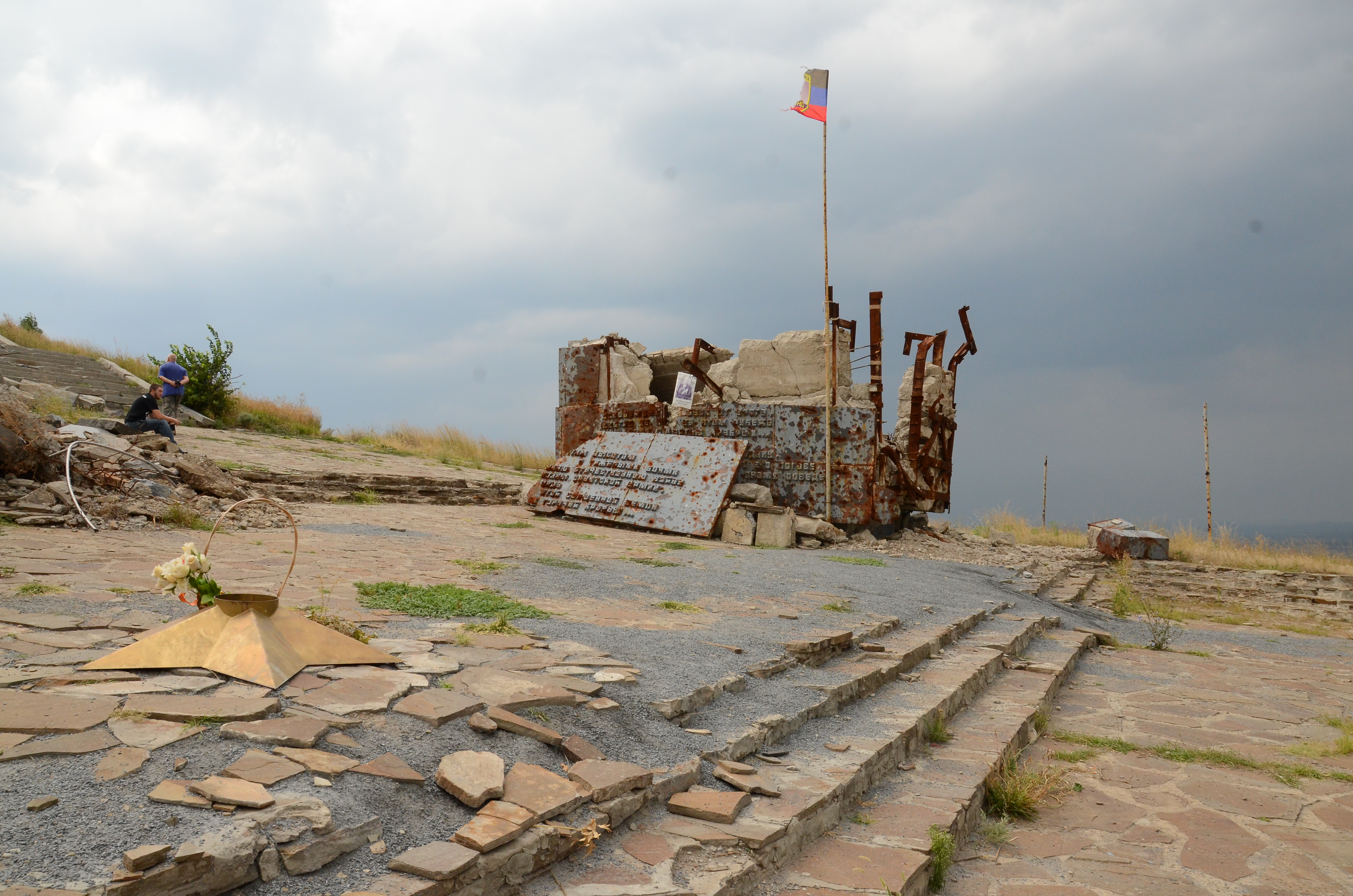
A memorial considerably damaged after the battle

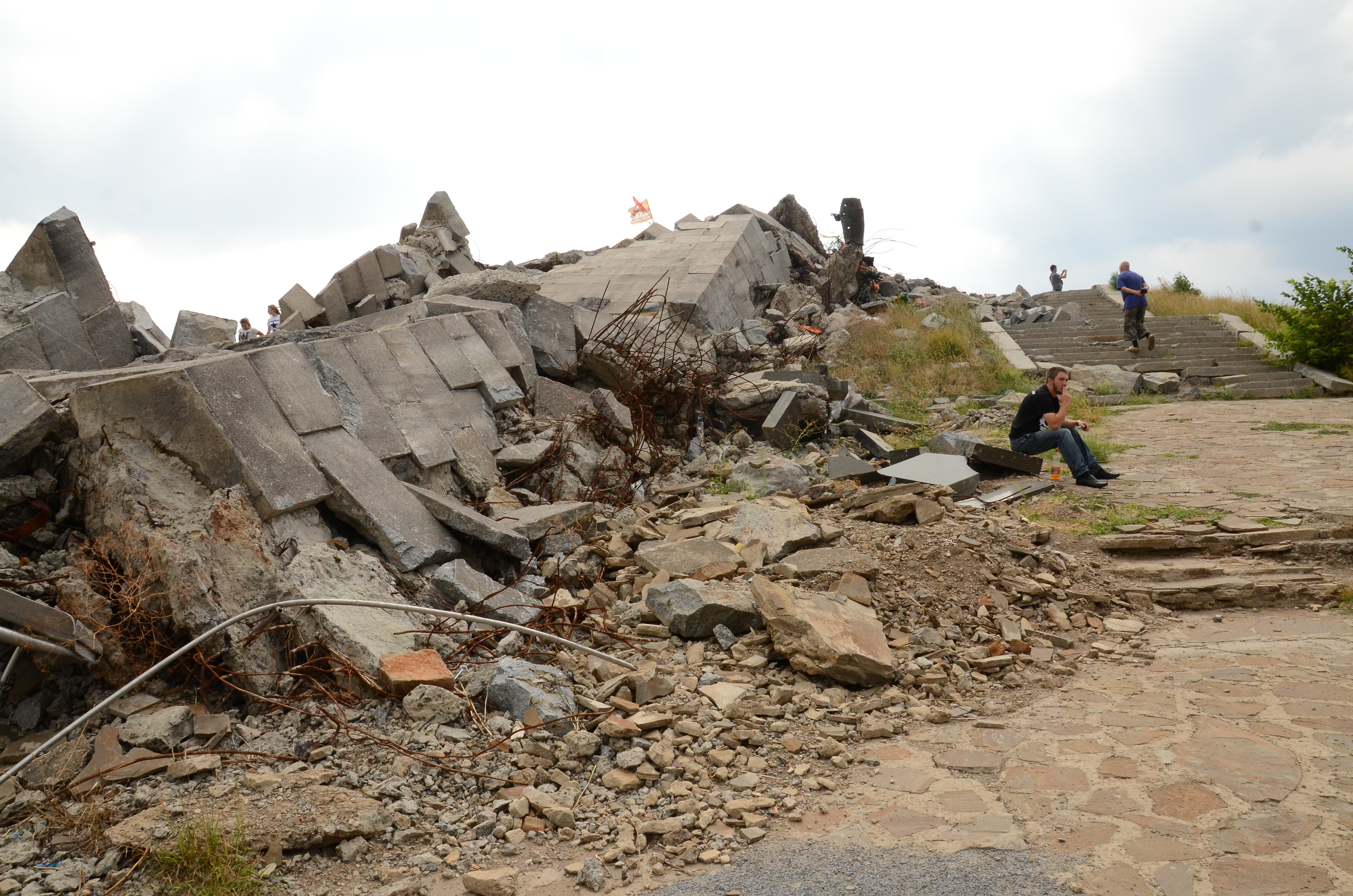
Path to the destroyed obelisk

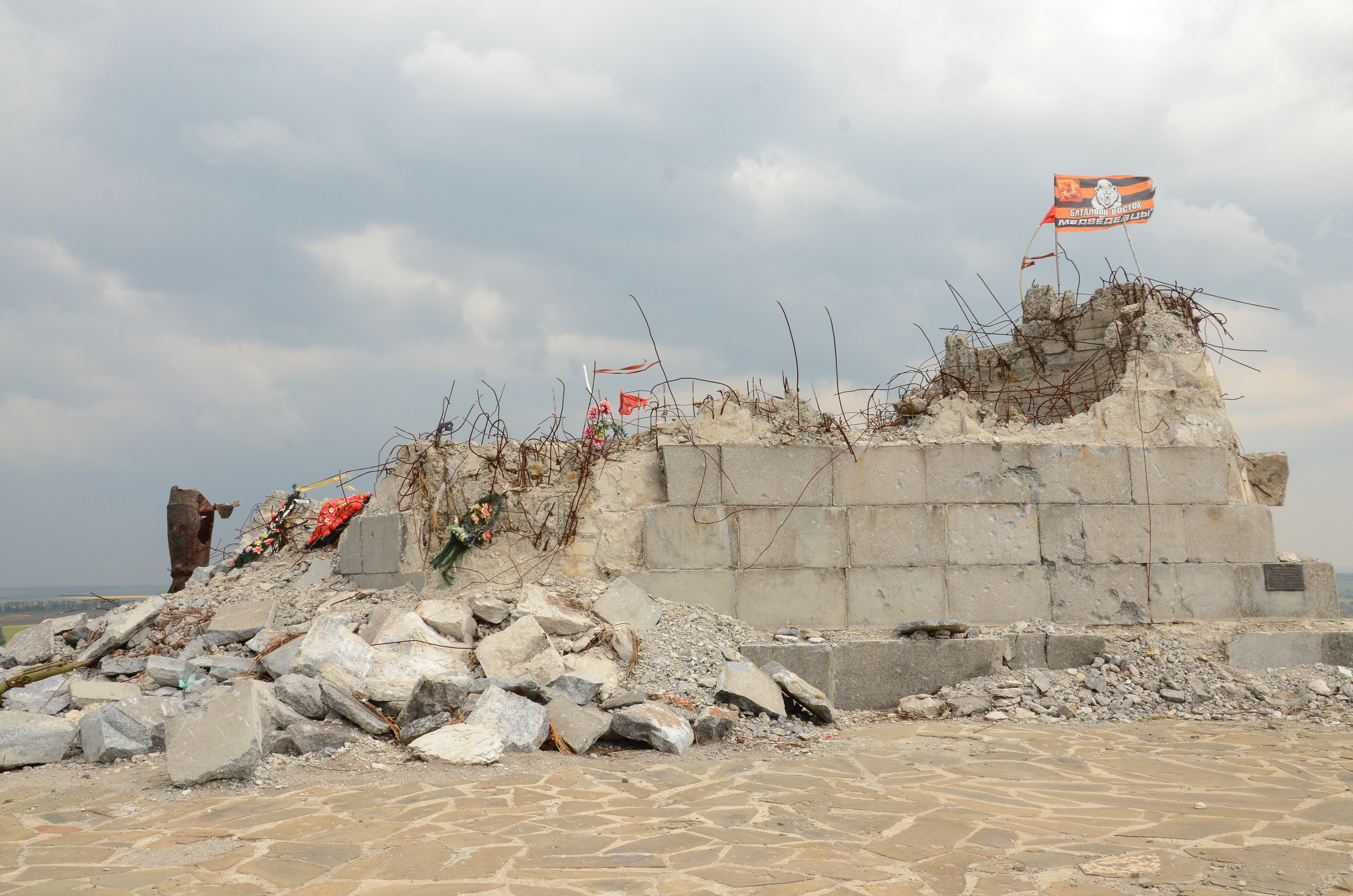
Outside view of the former obelisk

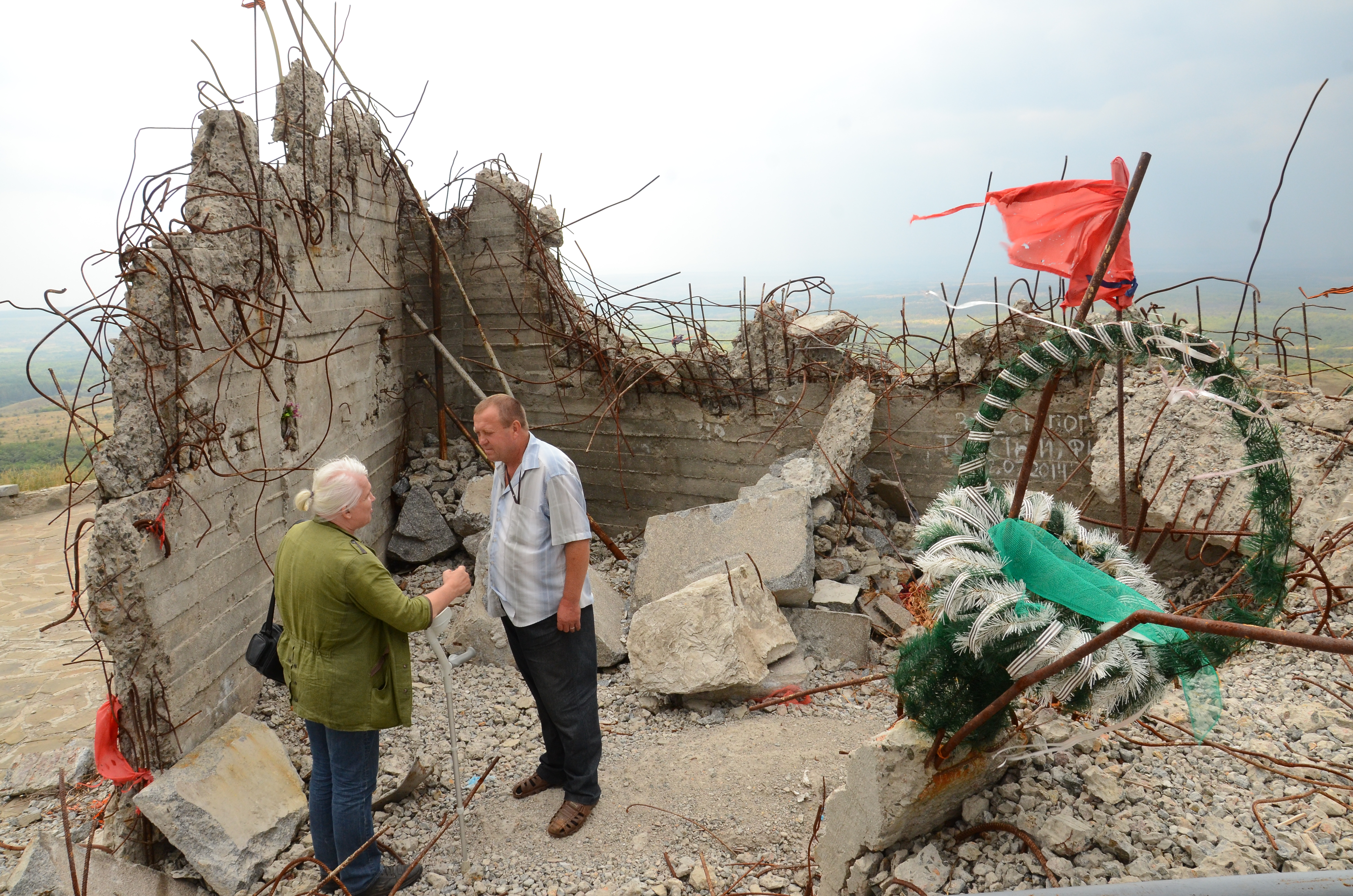
Rubble inside of the former obelisk

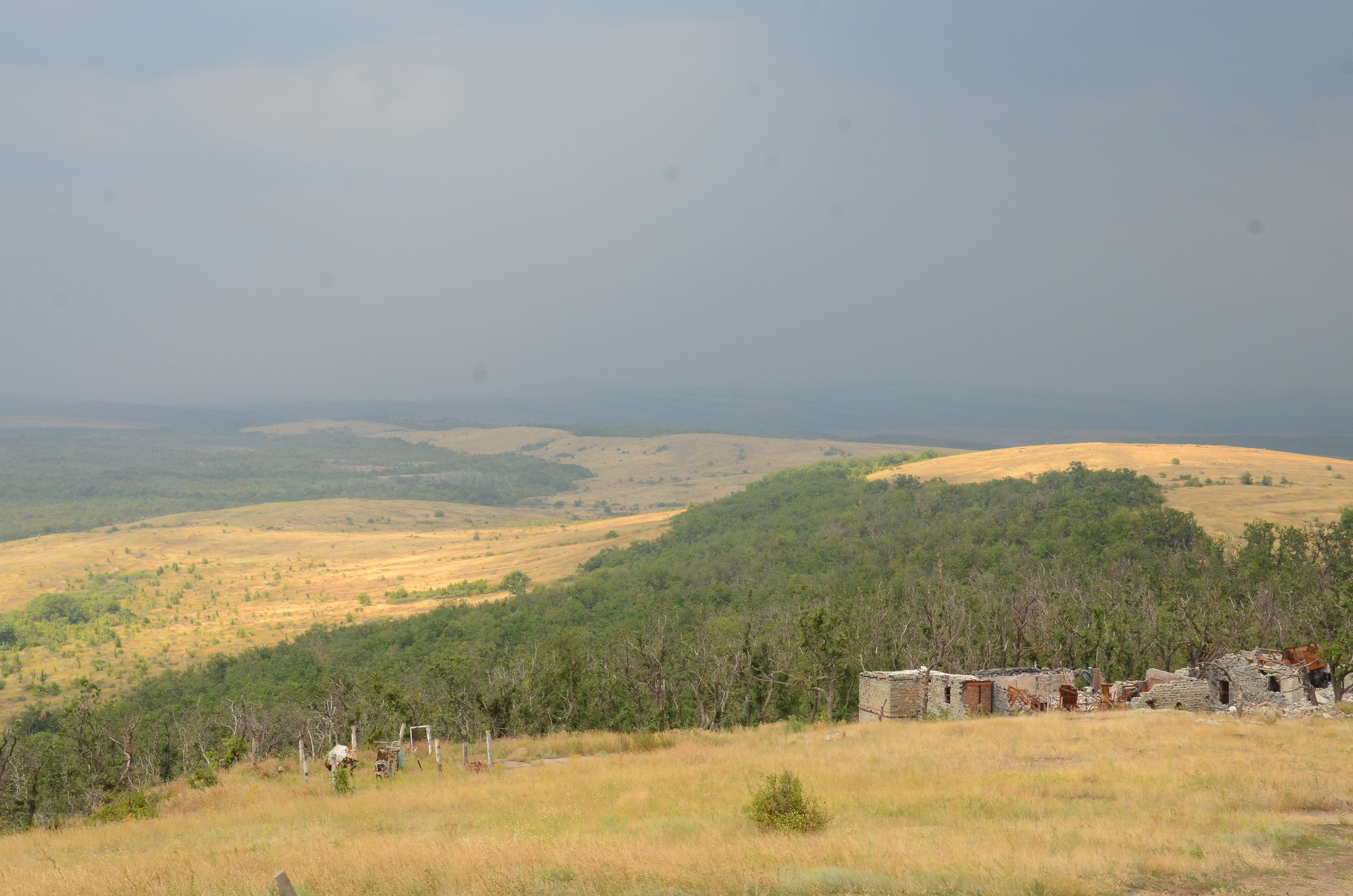
View of the area in front of Savur-Mohyla
