= Anatoly Ignashchenko =

Ukrainian architect of monuments and memorial complexes

- Анатолій Ігнащенко
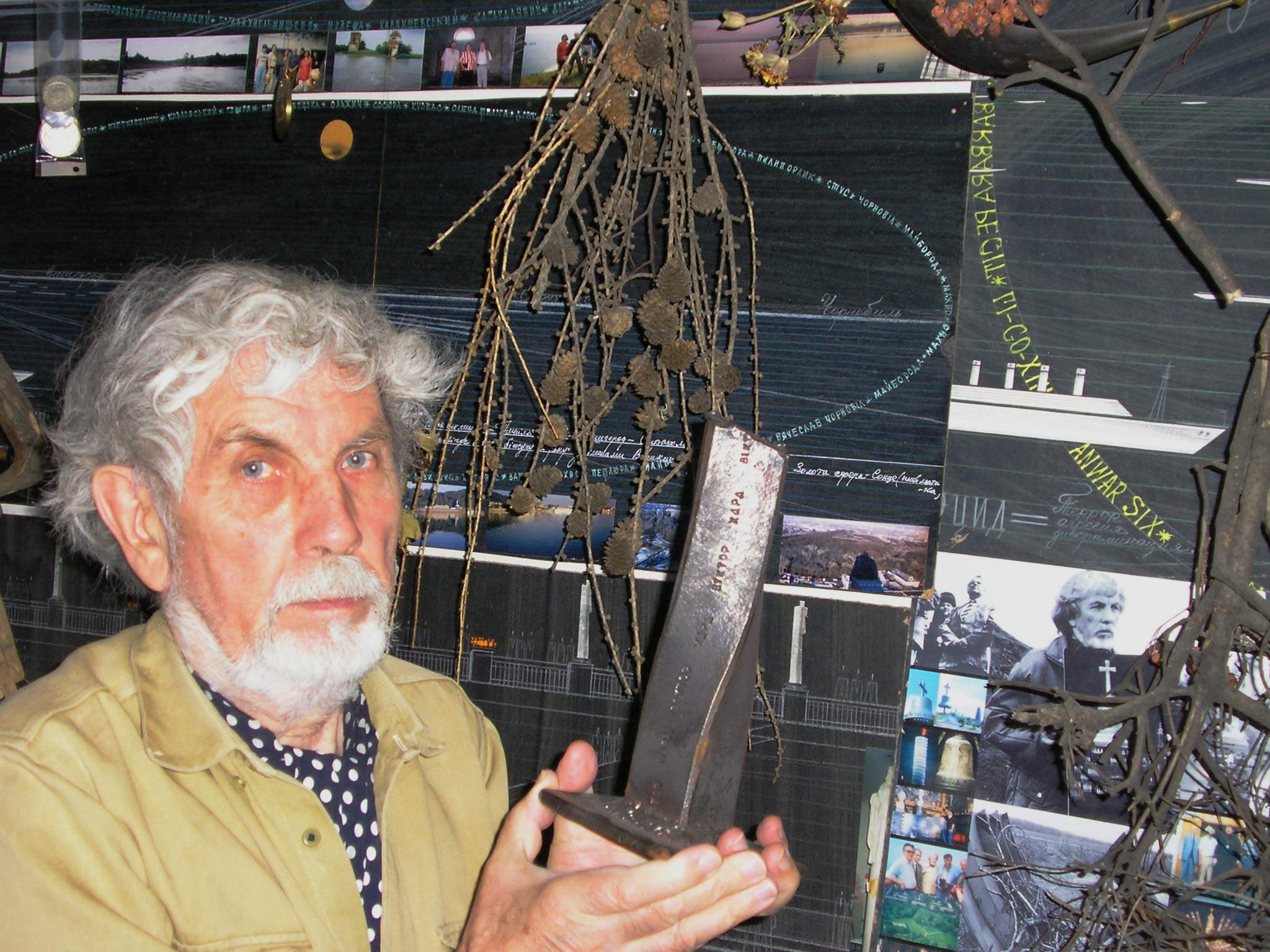
- Born: 28 January 1930; Zakharivtsi, Ukrainian SSR, Soviet Union
- Died: 5 April 2011 (aged 81); Kyiv, Ukraine
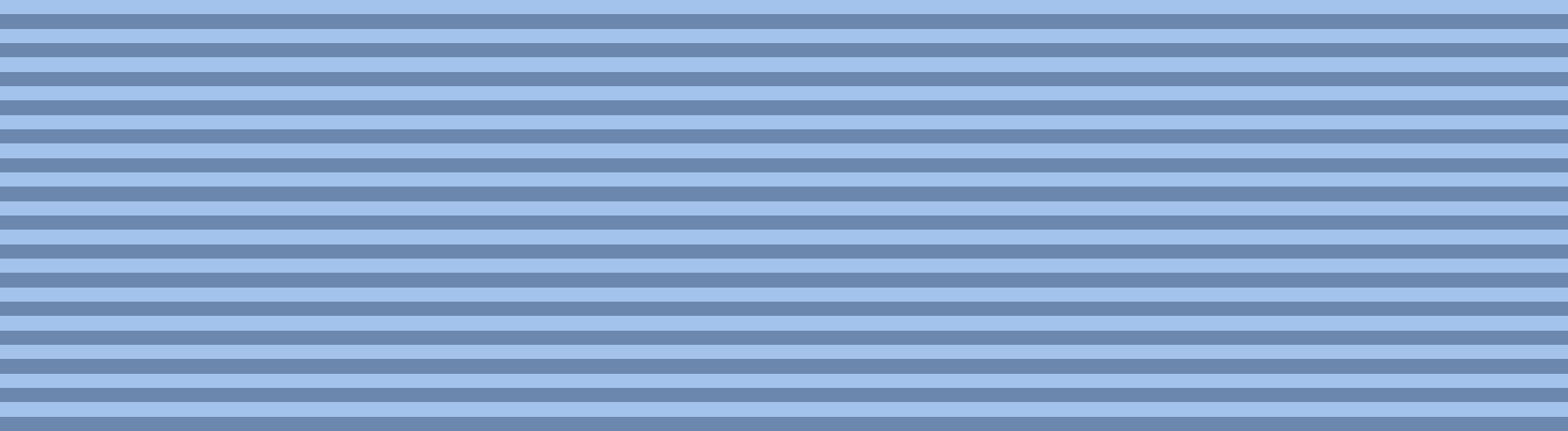
- Awards

Anatoly Fedorovych Ignashchenko (Ukrainian: Анатолій Федорович Ігнащенко; 28 January 1930 – 5 April 2011) was a Ukrainian architect, specializing in the design of monuments and memorial complexes. Mr. Ignashchenko was a member (academician) of the Ukrainian Academy of Arts. In 1974, he was awarded with the Shevchenko National Prize for his work on the Lesya Ukrainka monument. In 2010, he became awarded as a People's Artist of Ukraine. Other honours received include Order of Prince Yaroslav the Wise (2006) and Order of the Badge of Honour (1982).

== Biography ==
Anatoly Ignashchenko was born on 28 January 1930, in the village of Zaharivtsi (Khmelnitsky district, Khmelnytsky region). In 1953, he graduated from the Architecture Department of the Engineering Institute. He was a student of famous architect Joseph Karakis. From 1964 to 1966, he was the chief architect of the design institute "UkrNDIPUkrainian Urban Planning", in 1966–1969 he was an expert of the artistic expert board of the Ministry of Culture of the Ukrainian SSR.

In 1969–1976, he worked as an architect of the Art Fund of the Union of Artists of the Ukrainian SSR. In 1976–1990, he worked as an architect-artist of the "Khudozhnyk" Association of the Art Fund of the Ukrainian SSR. Since 1990, he has been working as an artist. He died on April 5, 2011. He was buried in Kyiv at the Baikove Cemetery (plot number 42).

== Projects ==
Some of Mr. Ignashchenko's notable works include:

- Babi Yar memorial
- Lesya Ukrainka monument
- Monument to Orange Revolution
- Monuments to Vasyl Poryk and Taras Shevchenko in Paris
- Hill of Sorrow Monument, one of the first memorials erected for the Holodomor
- Monuments to Taras Shevchenko in Monroe, New York
- Monument of Lesya Ukrainka (Kyiv, 1973, Yalta, Saskatoon, Canada, 1976)
- Monument of I. Kozlovsky (p. Maryanivka Kyiv region)
- Monument of Ivan Petrovich Kotlyarevsky (Kyiv, 1974)
