= Historic Areas of Istanbul =

World Heritage Sites in Turkey

UNESCO World Heritage Site
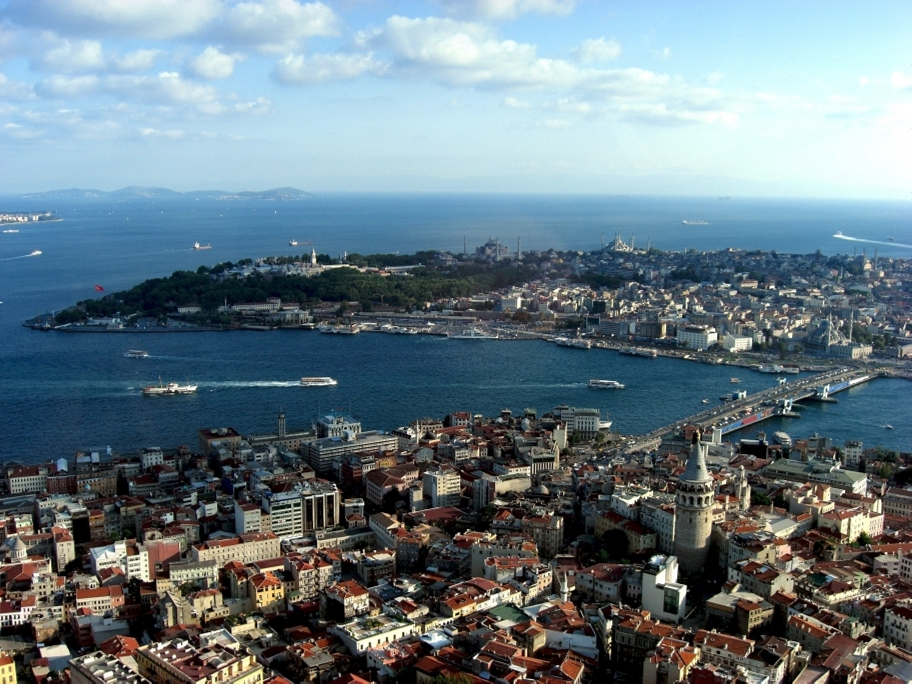
- From left to right: The Seraglio Point consisting of the Topkapı Palace and the Sea Walls; the Hagia Sophia; the Sultan Ahmed Mosque; and the Galata Tower in the foreground, across the Golden Horn.

- Location within Istanbul Location within Turkey
- Location: Fatih, Istanbul, Turkey
- Includes: 1. Sultanahmet Urban Archaeological Component Area; 2. Süleymaniye Mosque and its Associated Component Area; 3. Zeyrek Mosque (Pantocrator Church) and its Associated Component Area; 4. Istanbul Land Walls Component Area
- Criteria: Cultural: (i), (ii), (iii), (iv)
- Reference: 356bis
- Inscription: 1985 (9th Session)
- Extensions: 2017
- Area: 765.5 ha (1,892 acres)
- Coordinates: 41°0′30.49″N 28°58′47.75″E

The Historic Areas of Istanbul (Turkish: İstanbul'un Tarihî Alanları; Ottoman Turkish: استانبولك تاریخي اﻻنلری) are a group of sites in the capital district of Fatih in the city of Istanbul, Turkey, that were added to the UNESCO World Heritage List in 1985.

It includes buildings and structures such as the Sarayburnu, the Topkapı Palace, the Hagia Sophia, the Sultan Ahmed Mosque, the Hagia Irene, Zeyrek Mosque, Süleymaniye Mosque, Little Hagia Sophia and the walls of Constantinople.

== Zones ==
The World Heritage site covers four zones, illustrating the major phases of the city's history using its most prestigious monuments:

- the Archaeological Park, which in 1953 and 1956 was defined at the tip of the peninsula
- the Süleymaniye quarter, protected in 1980 and 1981
- the Zeyrek quarter, protected in 1979
- the zone of the ramparts, protected in 1981

== Gallery ==
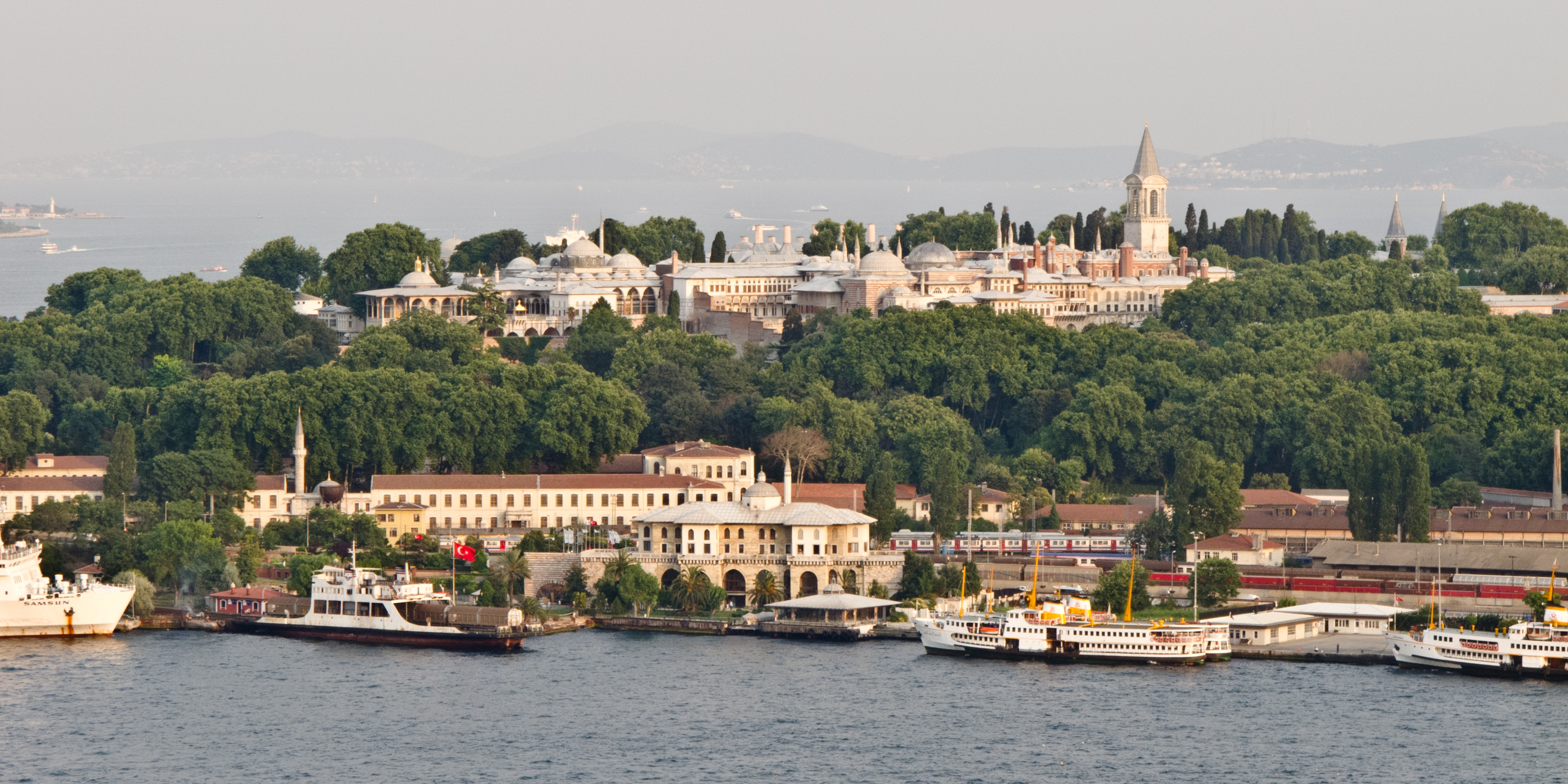
Topkapı Palace

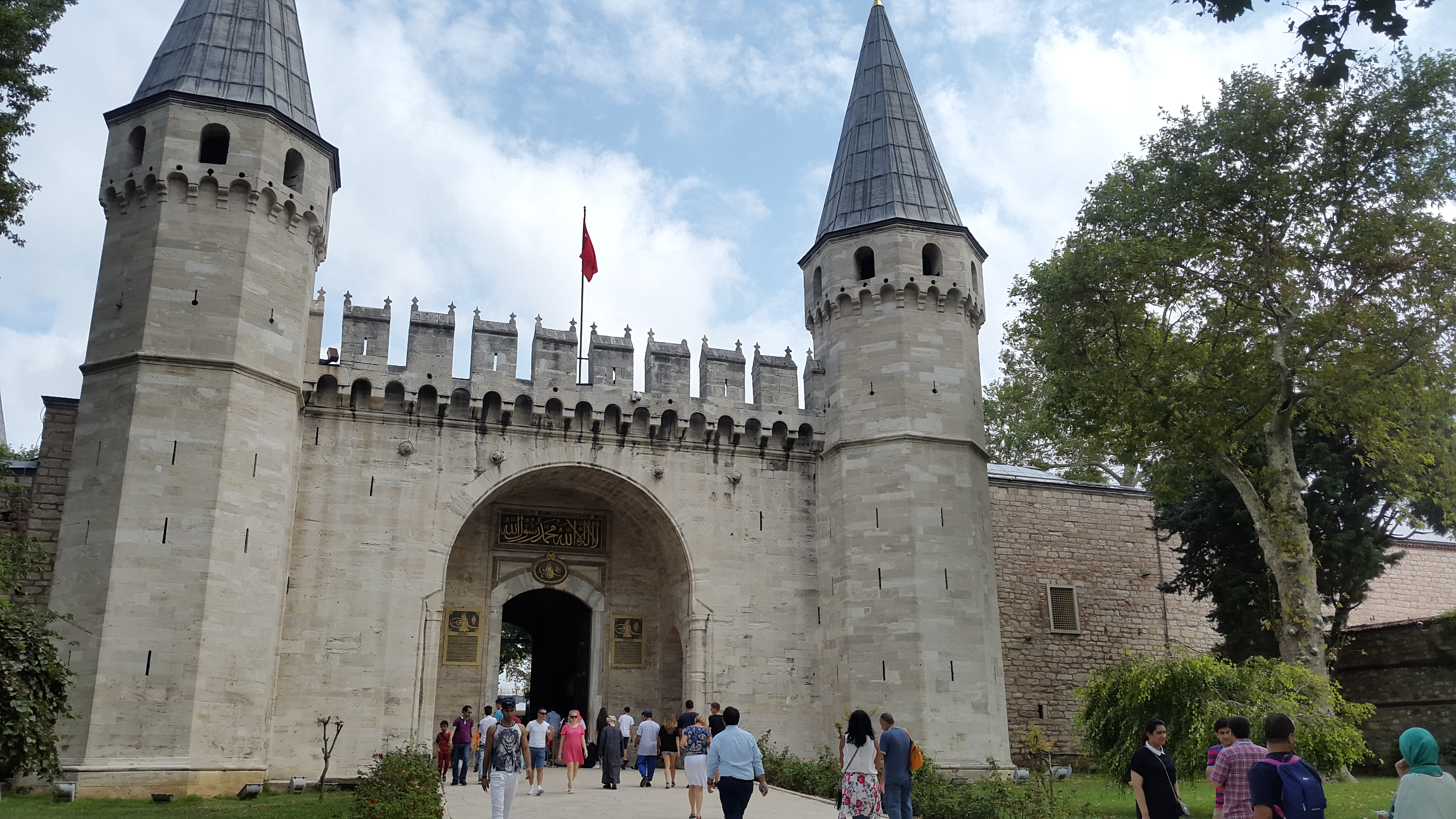
Topkapı Palace

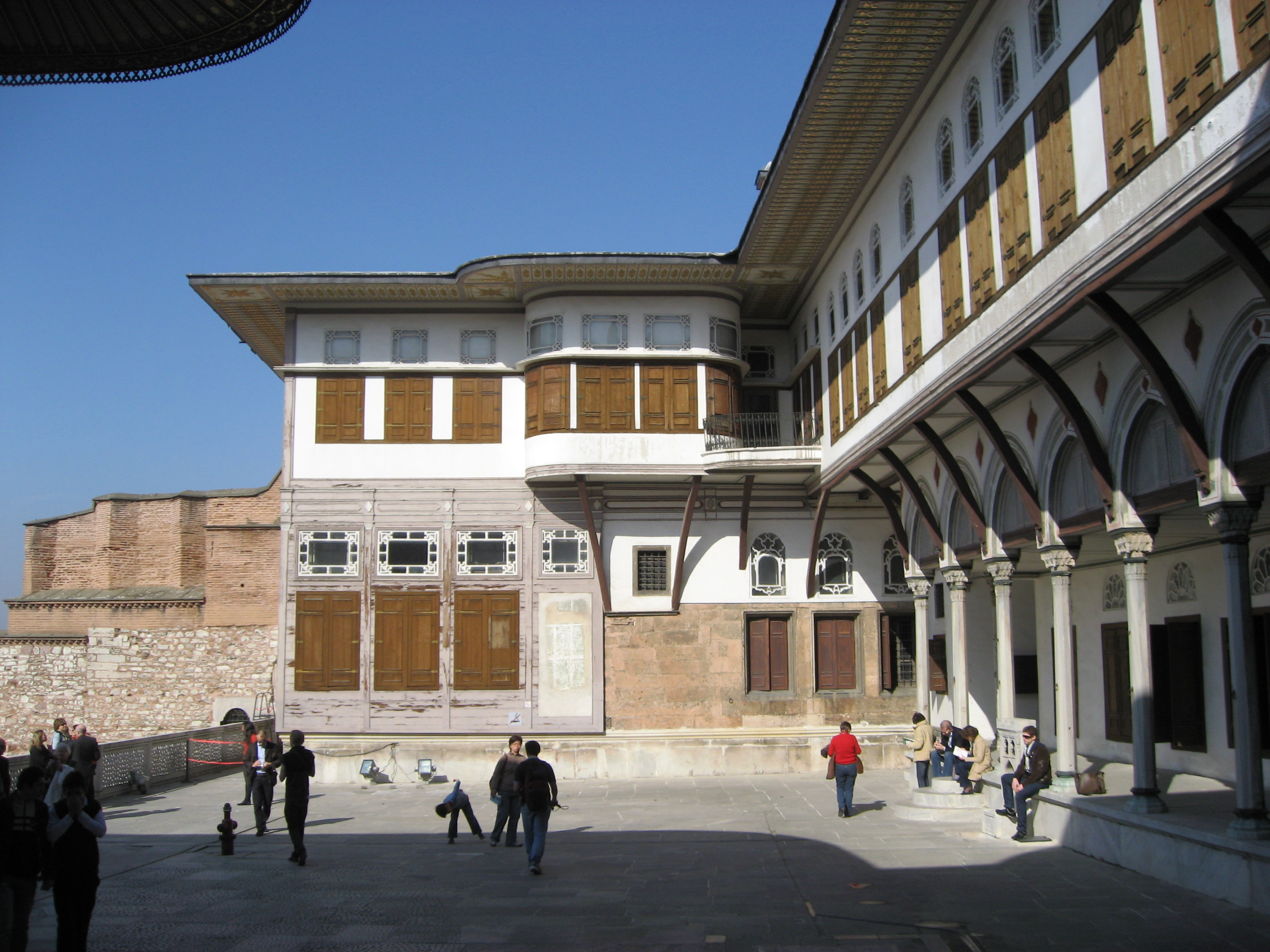
Topkapı Palace

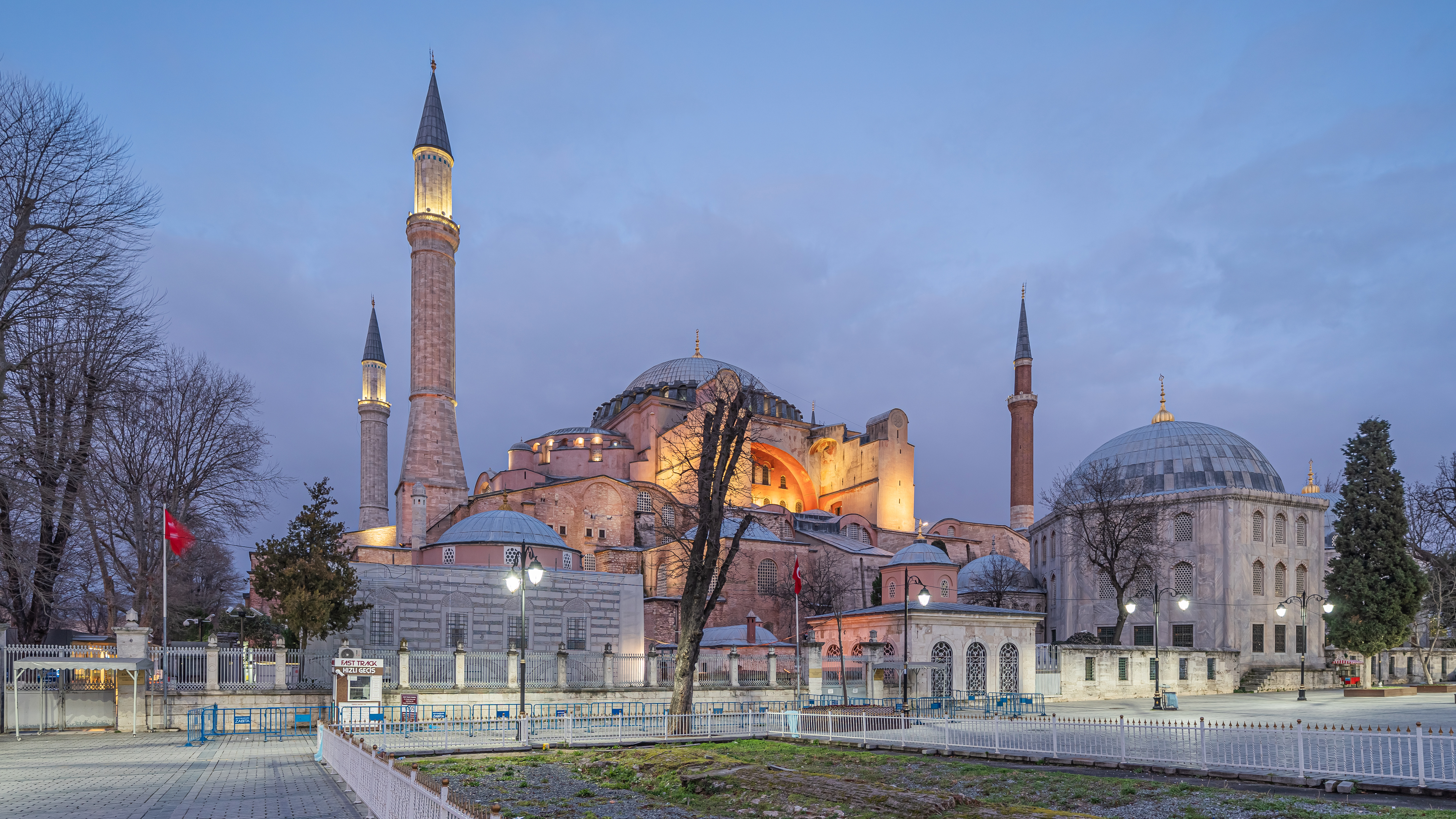
Hagia Sophia

Hagia Sophia

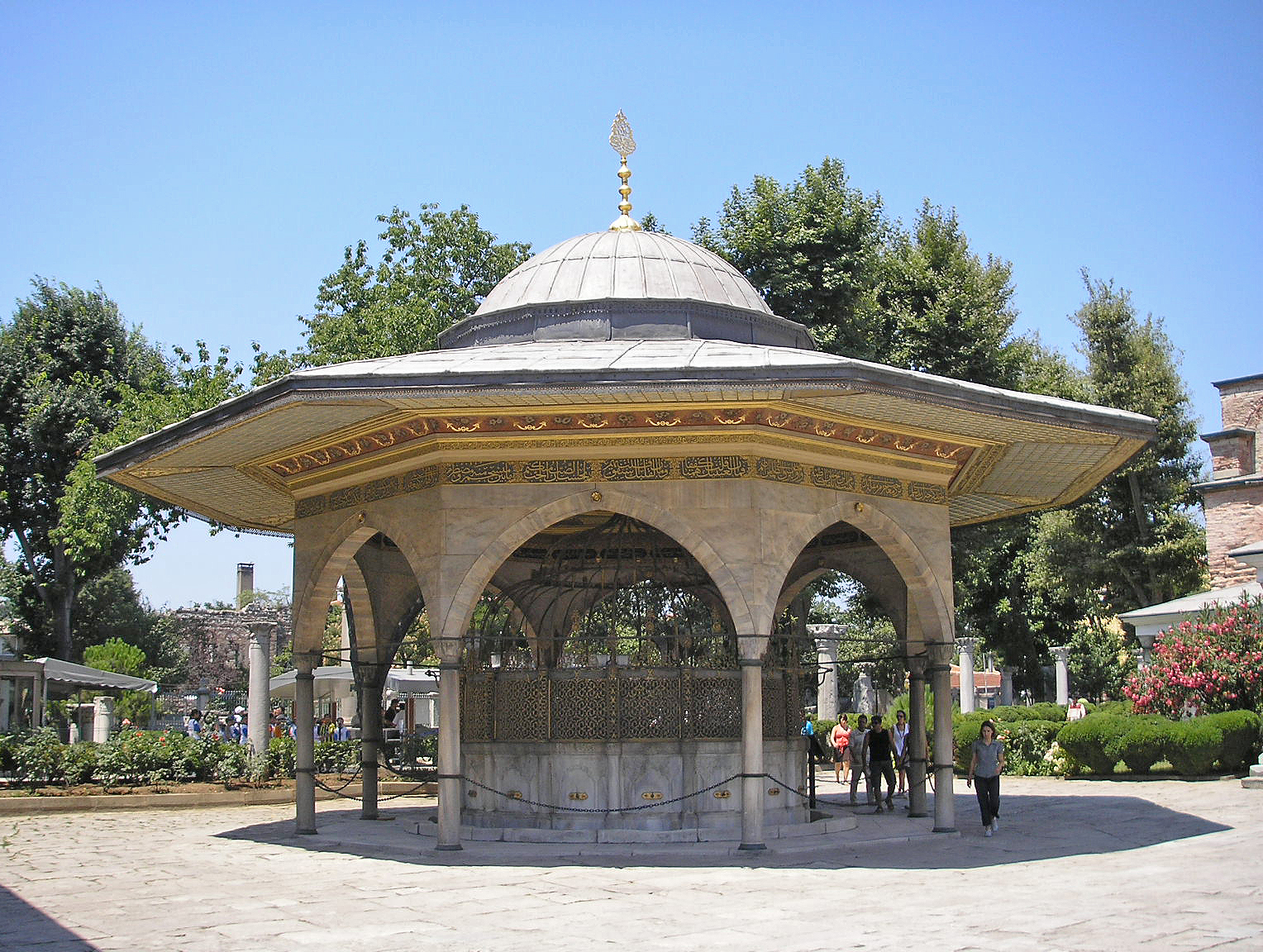
Hagia Sophia

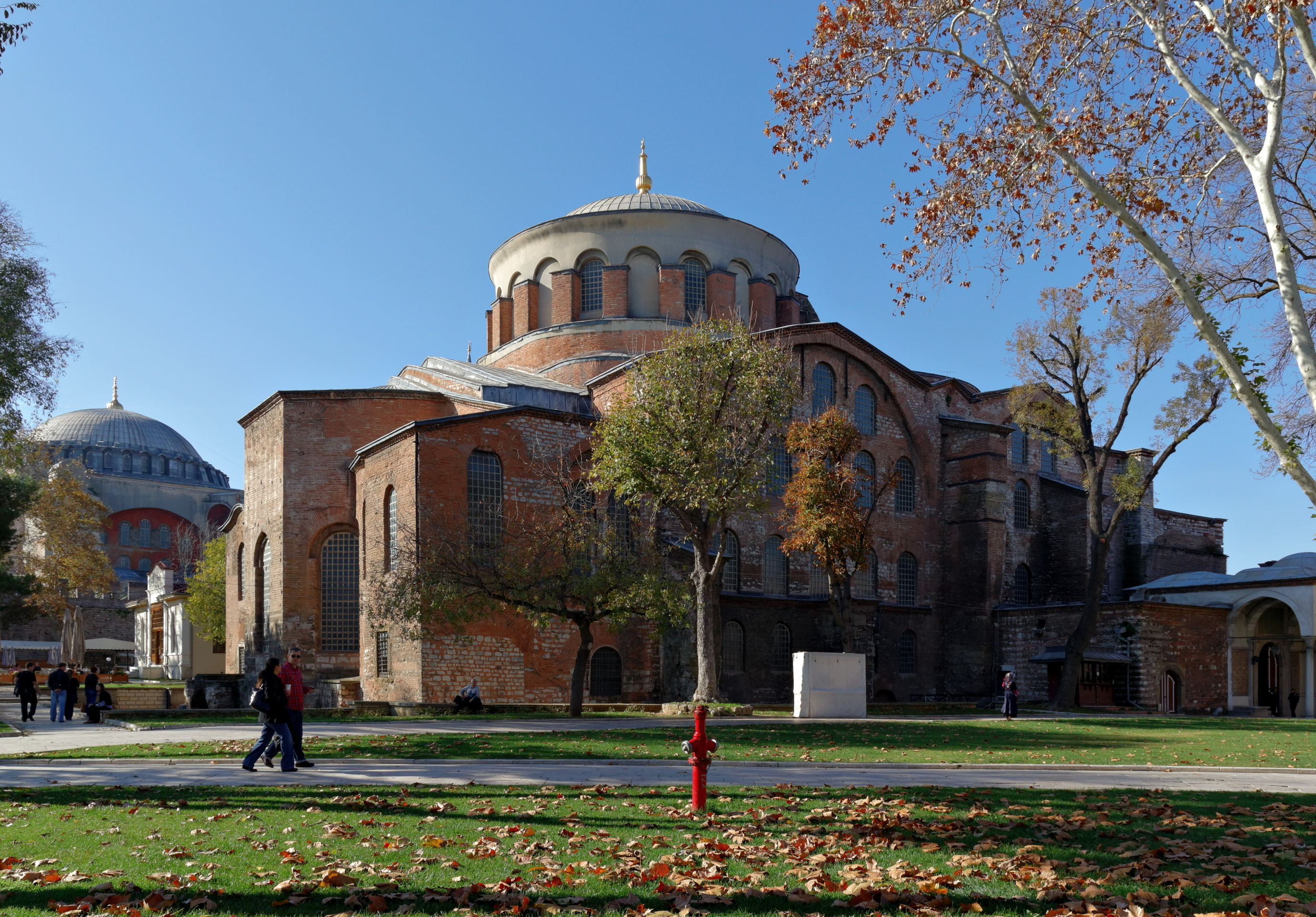
Hagia Irene

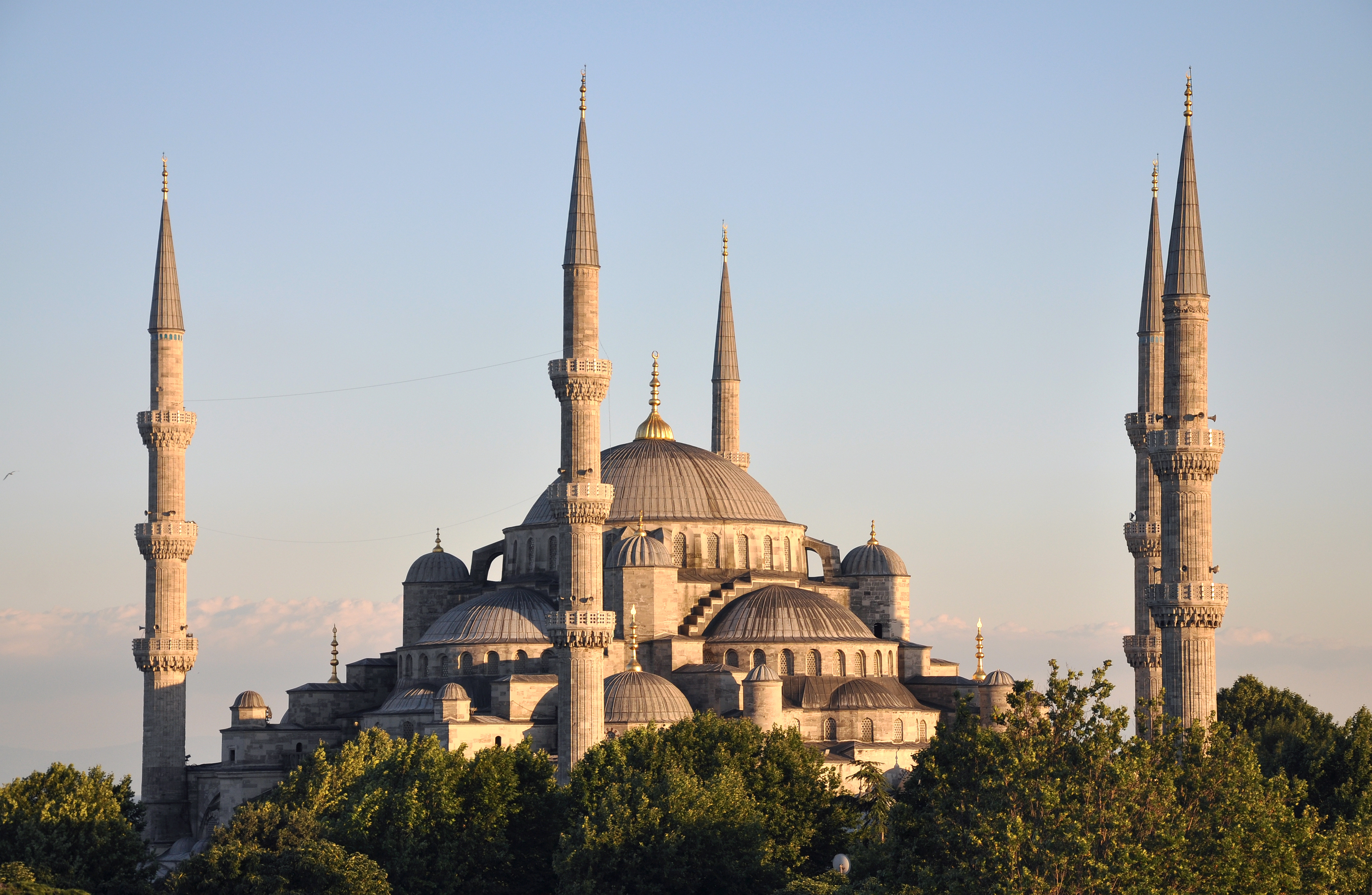
Sultan Ahmed Mosque

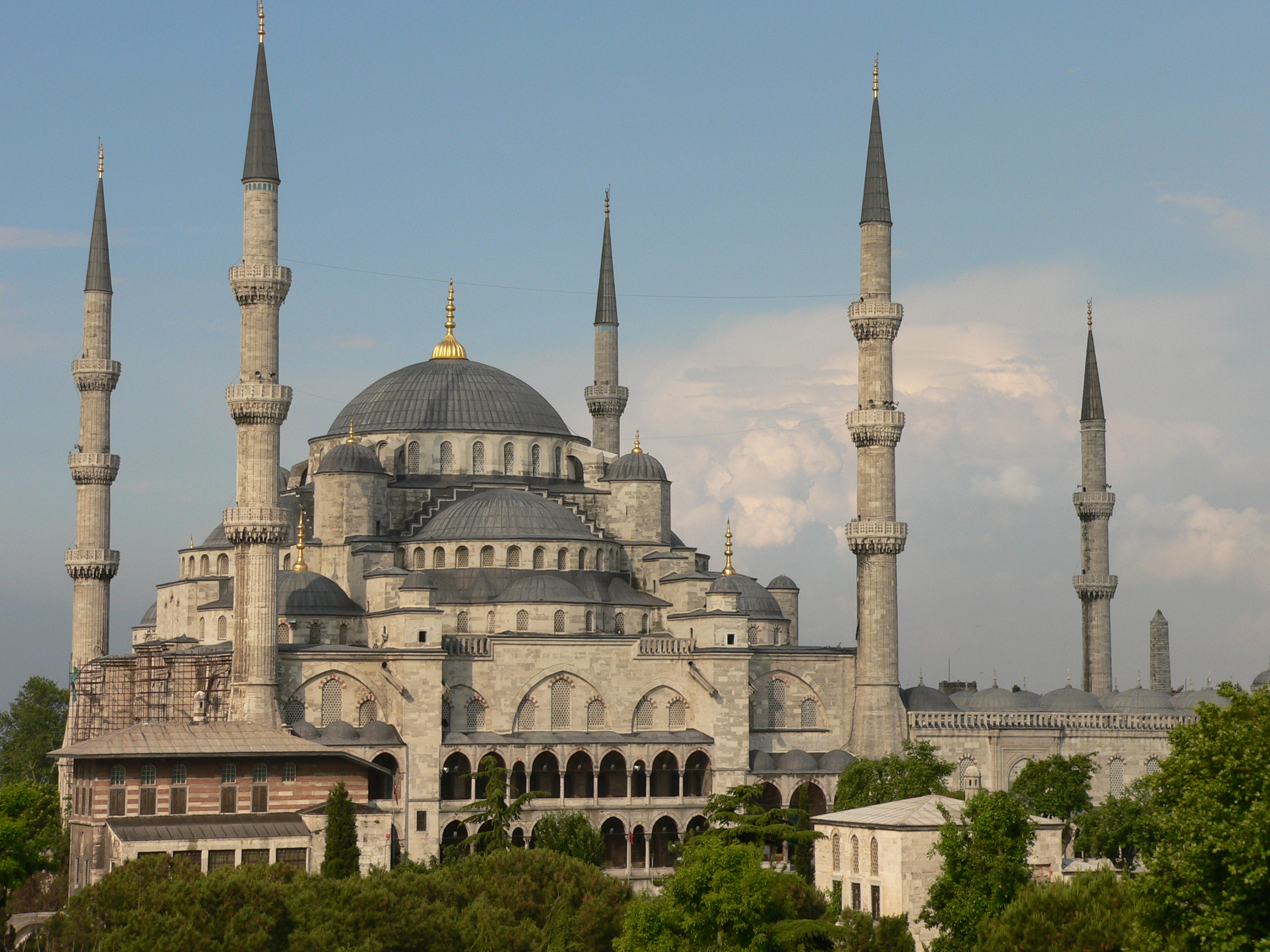
Sultan Ahmed Mosque

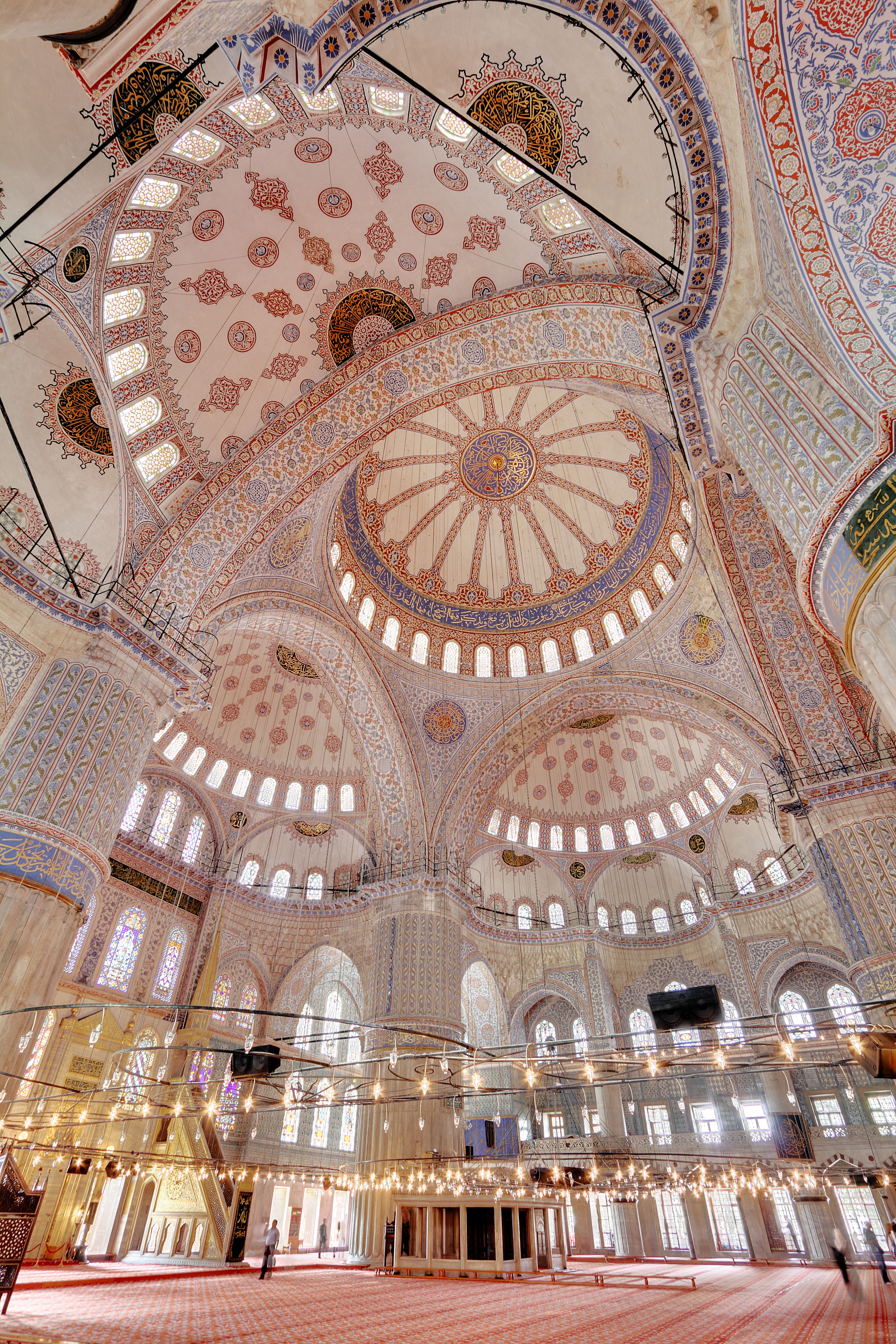
Sultan Ahmed Mosque

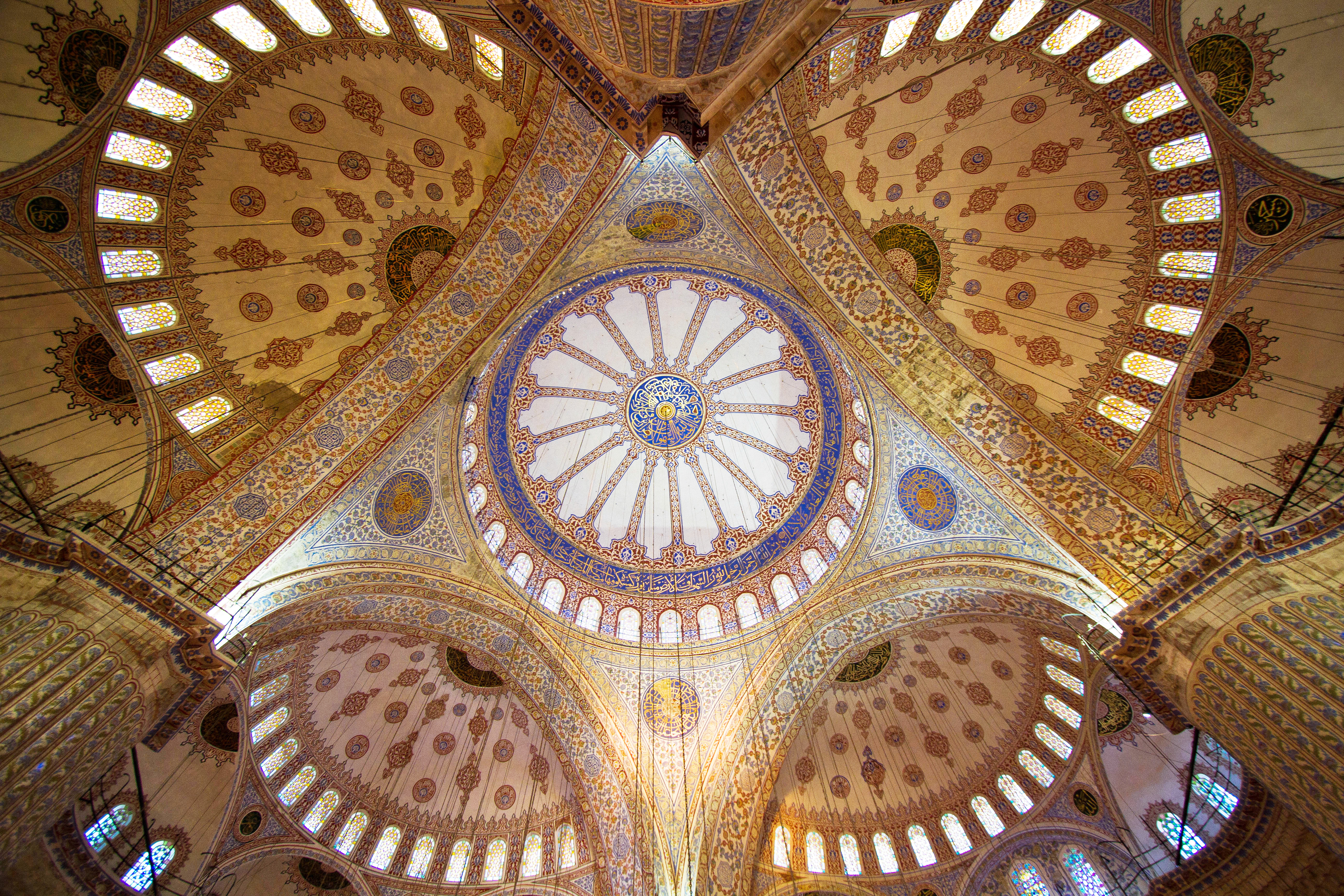
Sultan Ahmed Mosque

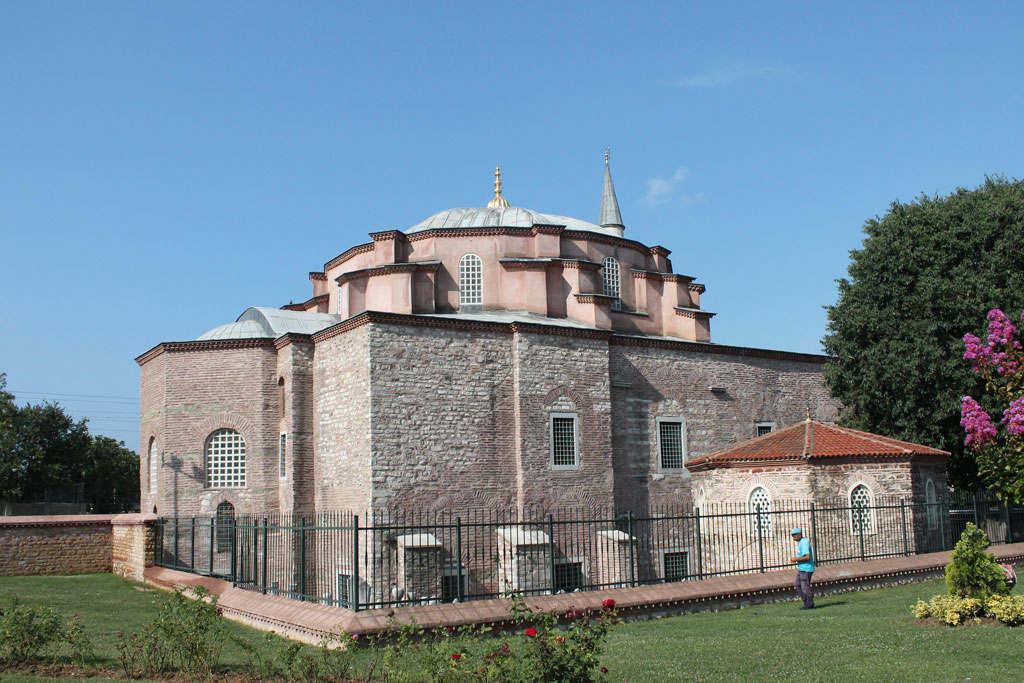
Little Hagia Sophia

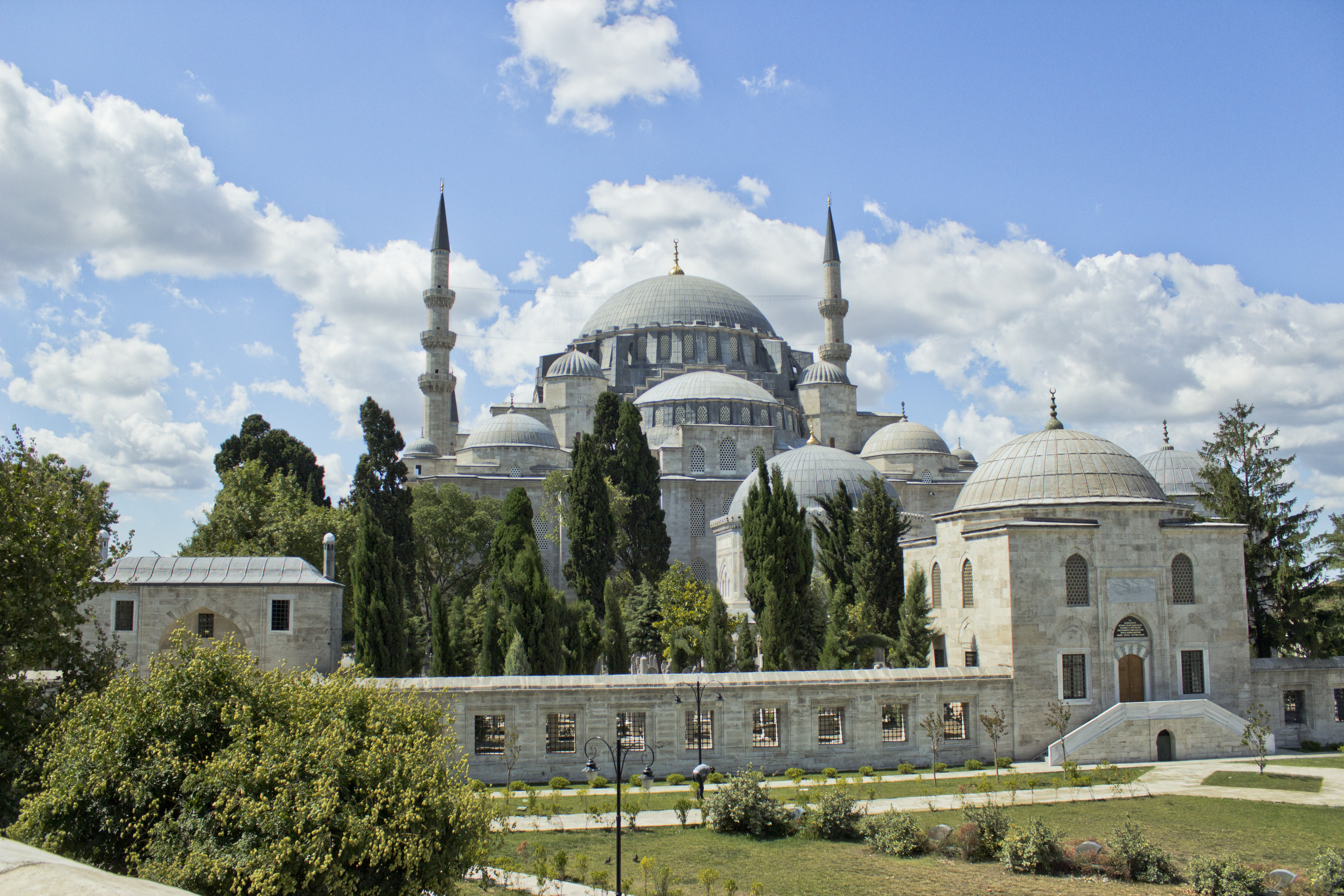
Süleymaniye Mosque

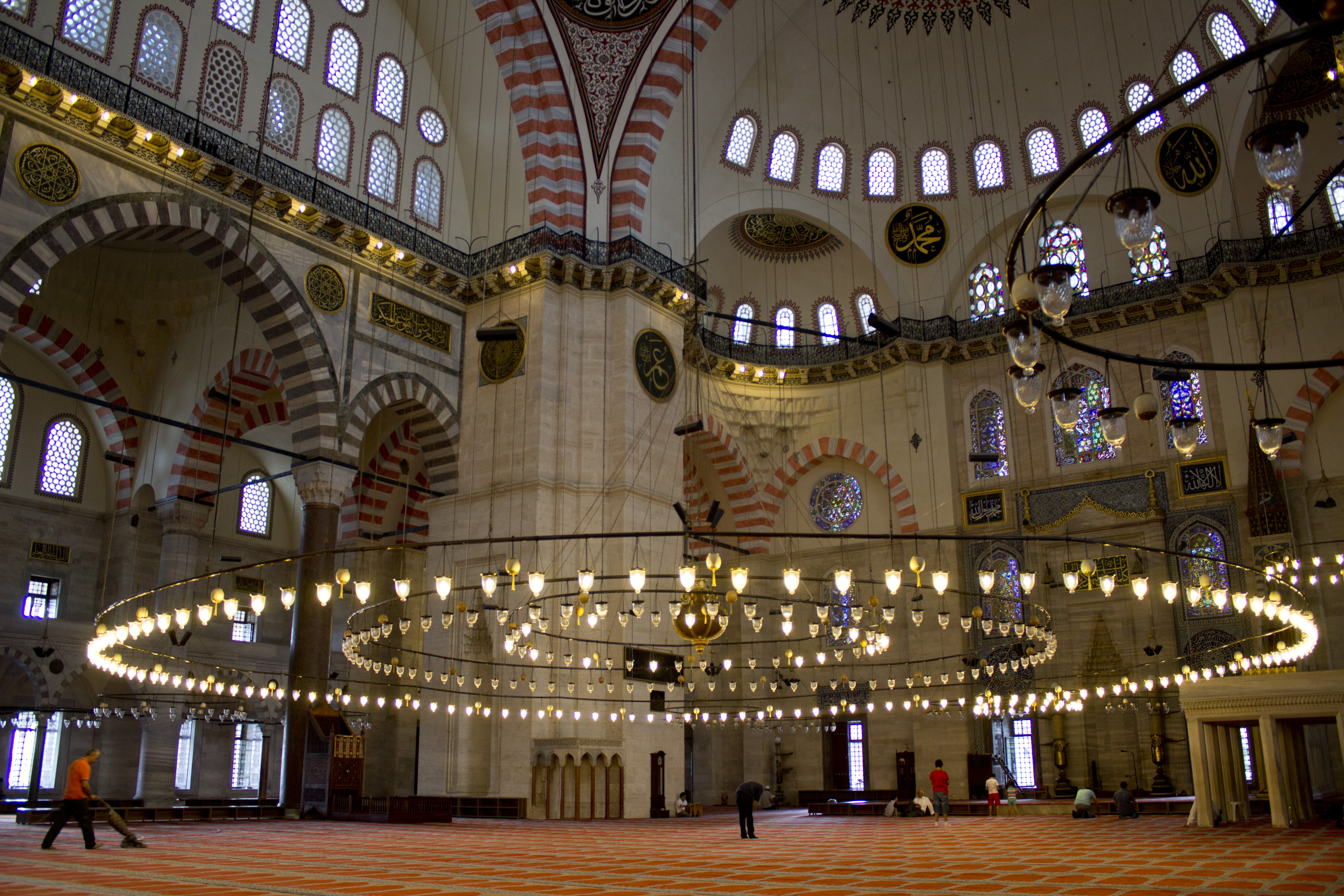
Süleymaniye Mosque

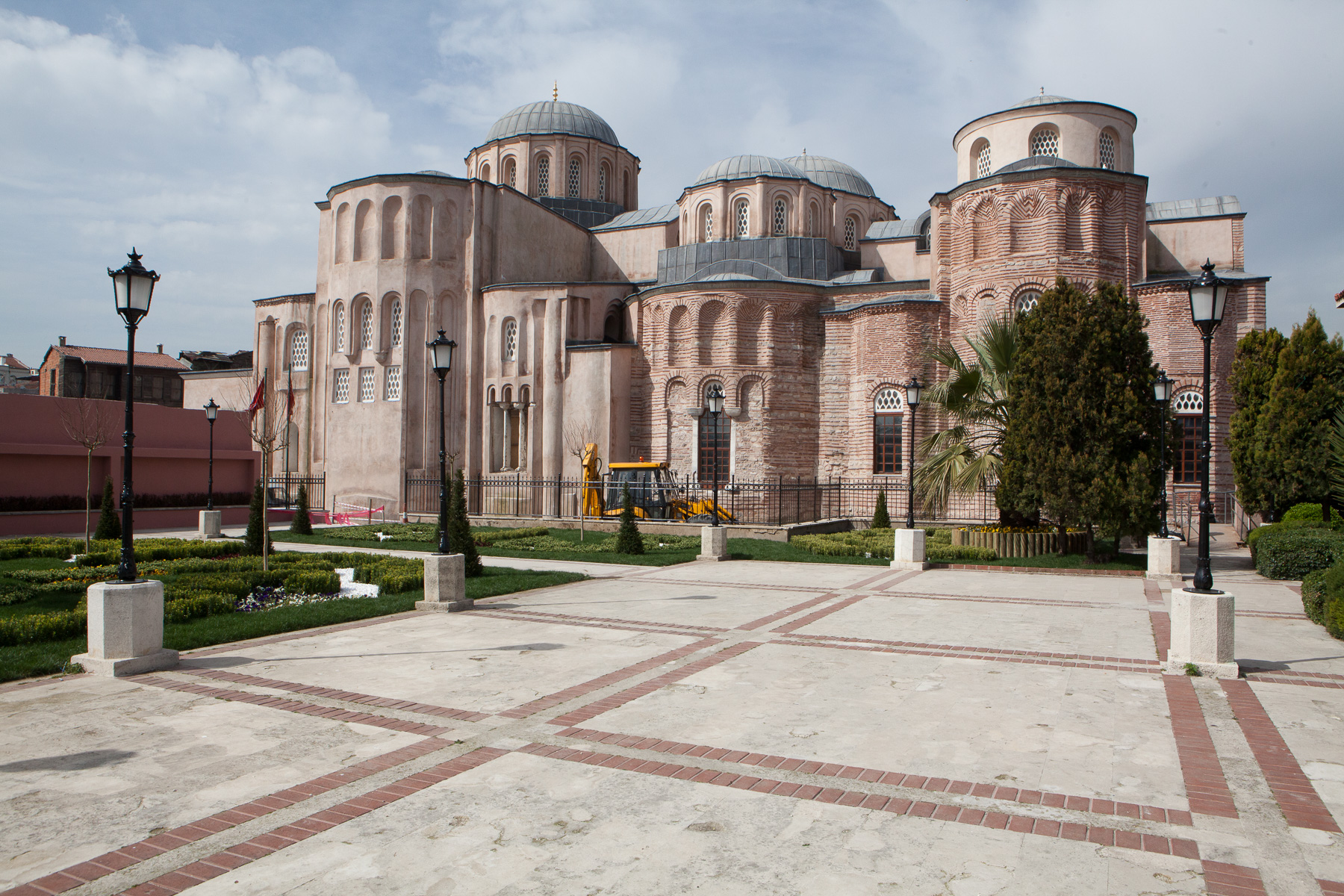
Zeyrek Mosque

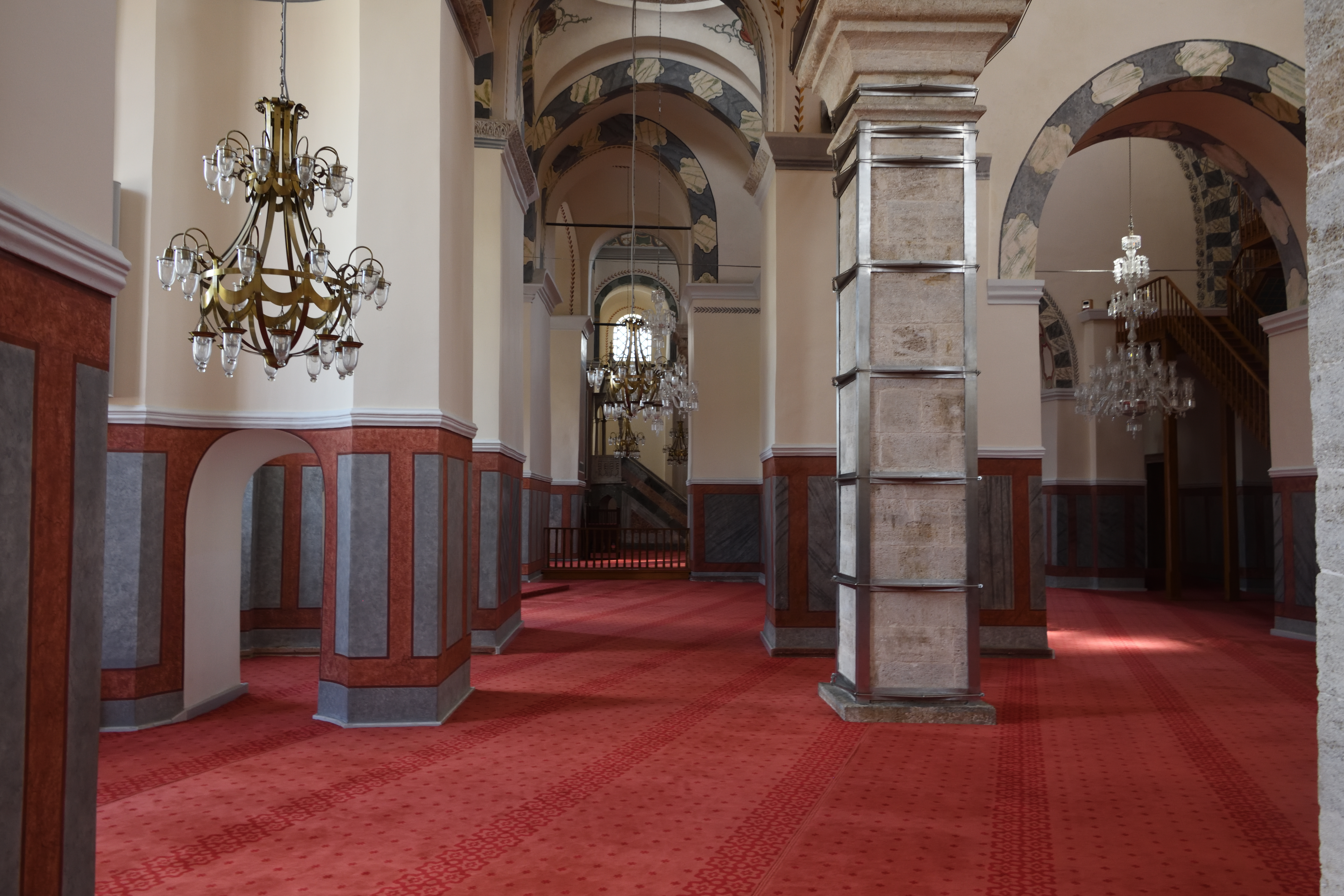
Zeyrek Mosque

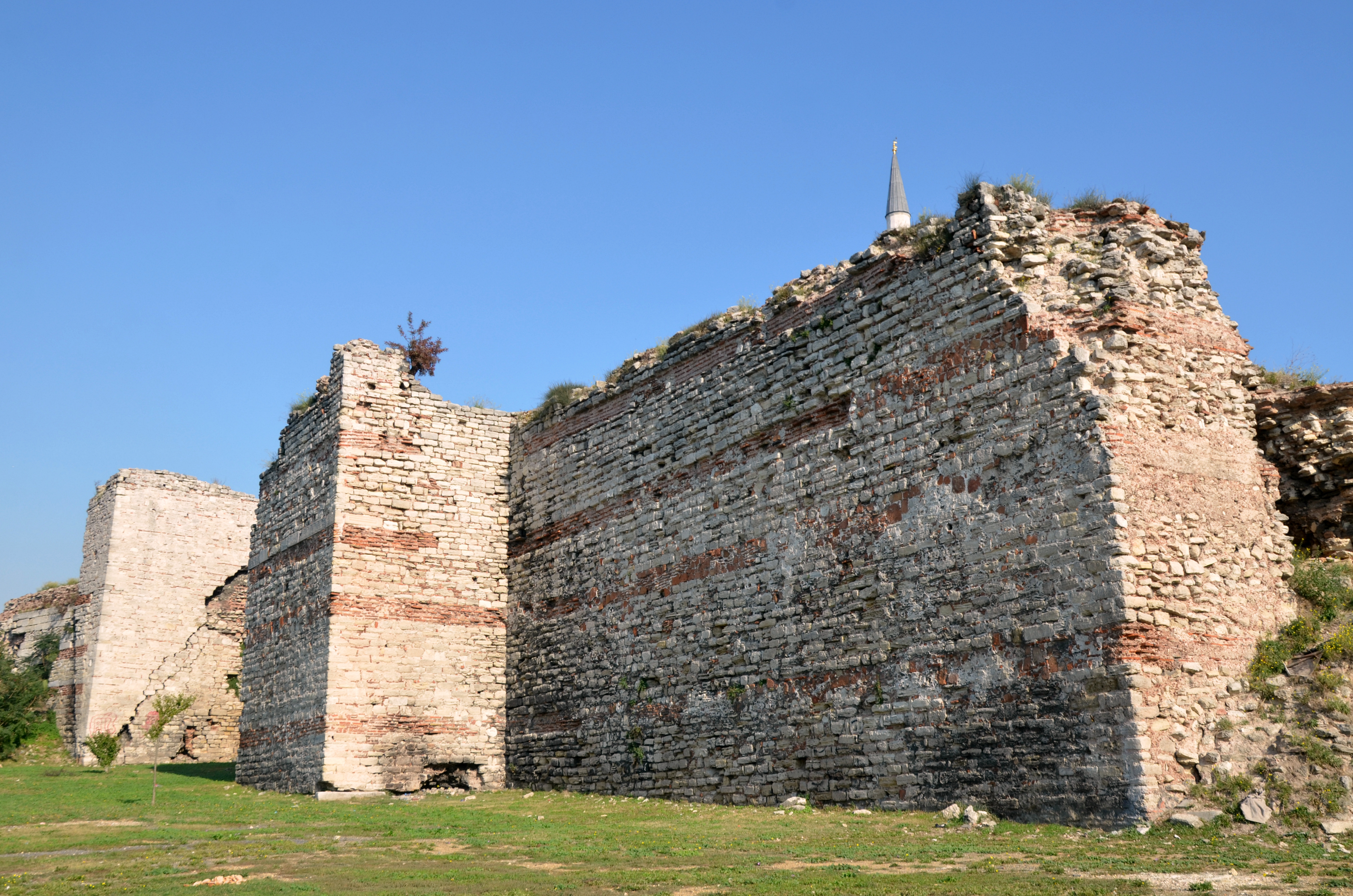
Walls of Constantinople
