= Sultanahmet =

Sultanahmet (named after Sultan Ahmed) may refer to these places in Istanbul:

- Sultanahmet is a neighbourhood in the district of Fatih
- Sultan Ahmed Mosque (Sultanahmet Mosque)
- Sultanahmet Square (Hippodrome of Constantinople)
- Sultanahmet Jail, now a hotel

== See also ==
- Sultan Ahmed Mosque (disambiguation): other namesake mosques, mostly in Europe
