= Blue Mosque, Istanbul =

17th-century mosque in Turkey

- Sultanahmet Camii
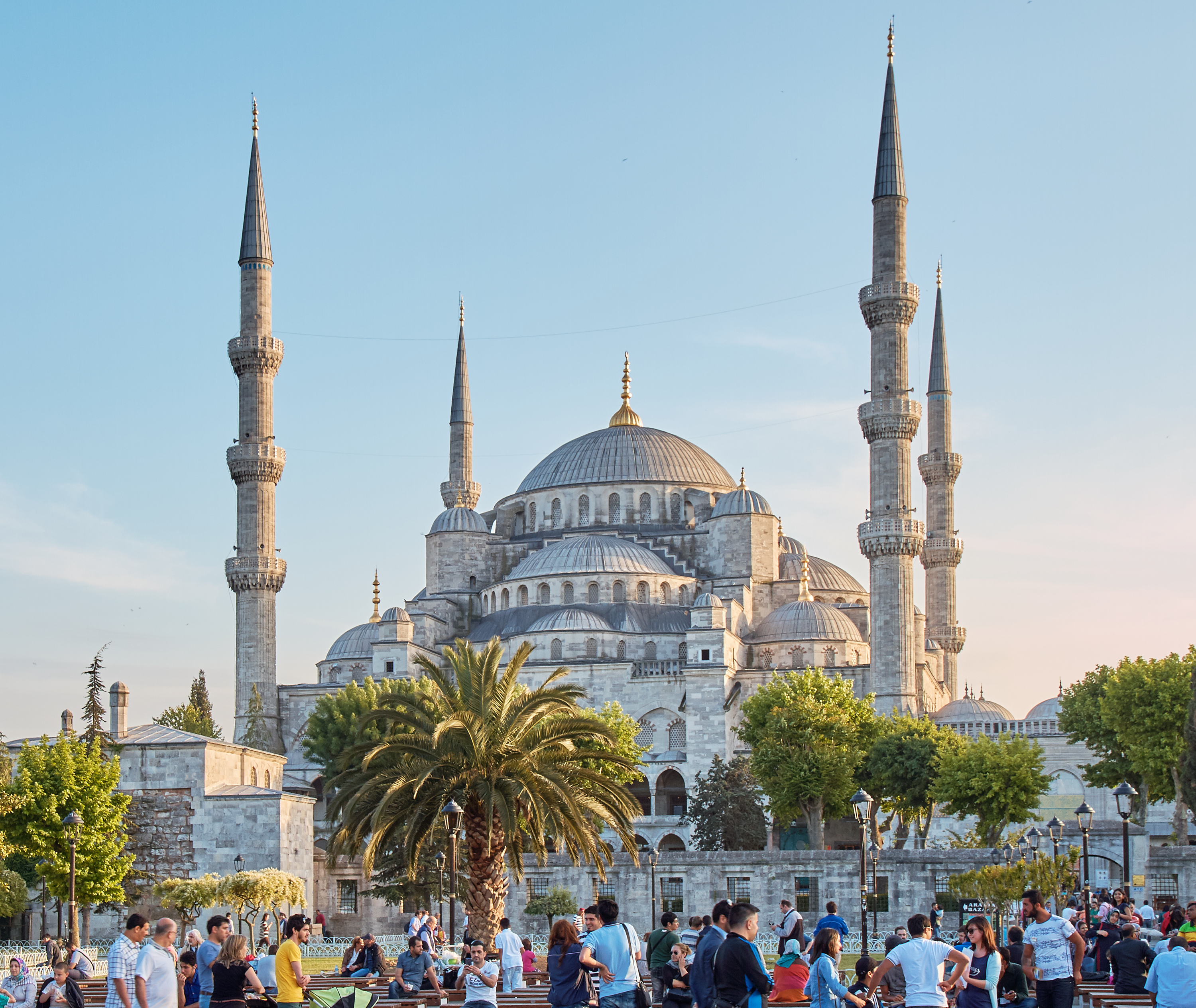

Religion
- Affiliation: Sunni Islam
- Status: Active

Location
- Location: Fatih, Istanbul, Turkey
- Interactive map of Blue Mosque, Istanbul
- Coordinates: 41°00′19″N 28°58′37″E

Architecture
- Architect: Sedefkar Mehmed Agha
- Type: Mosque
- Style: Classical Ottoman
- Groundbreaking: 1609
- Completed: 1617

Specifications
- Length: 73 m (240 ft)
- Width: 65 m (213 ft)
- Dome height (inner): 43 m (141 ft)
- Dome dia. (inner): 23.5 m (77 ft)
- Minaret: 6
- Minaret height: 64 m (210 ft)

Website
- Official website

UNESCO World Heritage Site
- Part of: Historic Areas of Istanbul
- Criteria: Cultural: i, ii, iii, iv
- Reference: 356
- Inscription: 1985 (9th Session)

The Sultan Ahmed Mosque (Turkish: Sultanahmet Camii), popularly known as the Blue Mosque, is an Ottoman-era historical imperial mosque located in Istanbul, Turkey. It was constructed between 1609 and 1617 during the rule of Ahmed I. It attracts a large number of tourists and is one of the most iconic and popular monuments of Ottoman architecture.

The mosque has a classical Ottoman layout with a central dome surrounded by four semi-domes over the prayer hall. It is fronted by a large courtyard and flanked by six minarets. On the inside, it is decorated with thousands of Iznik tiles and painted floral motifs in predominantly blue colours, which give the mosque its popular name. The mosque's külliye (religious complex) includes Ahmed's tomb, a madrasa, and several other buildings in various states of preservation.

The mosque was built next to the former Hippodrome and stands across from the Hagia Sophia, another popular tourist site. The Blue Mosque was included in the UNESCO World Heritage Site list in 1985 under the name of "Historic Areas of Istanbul".

== History ==
=== Construction ===
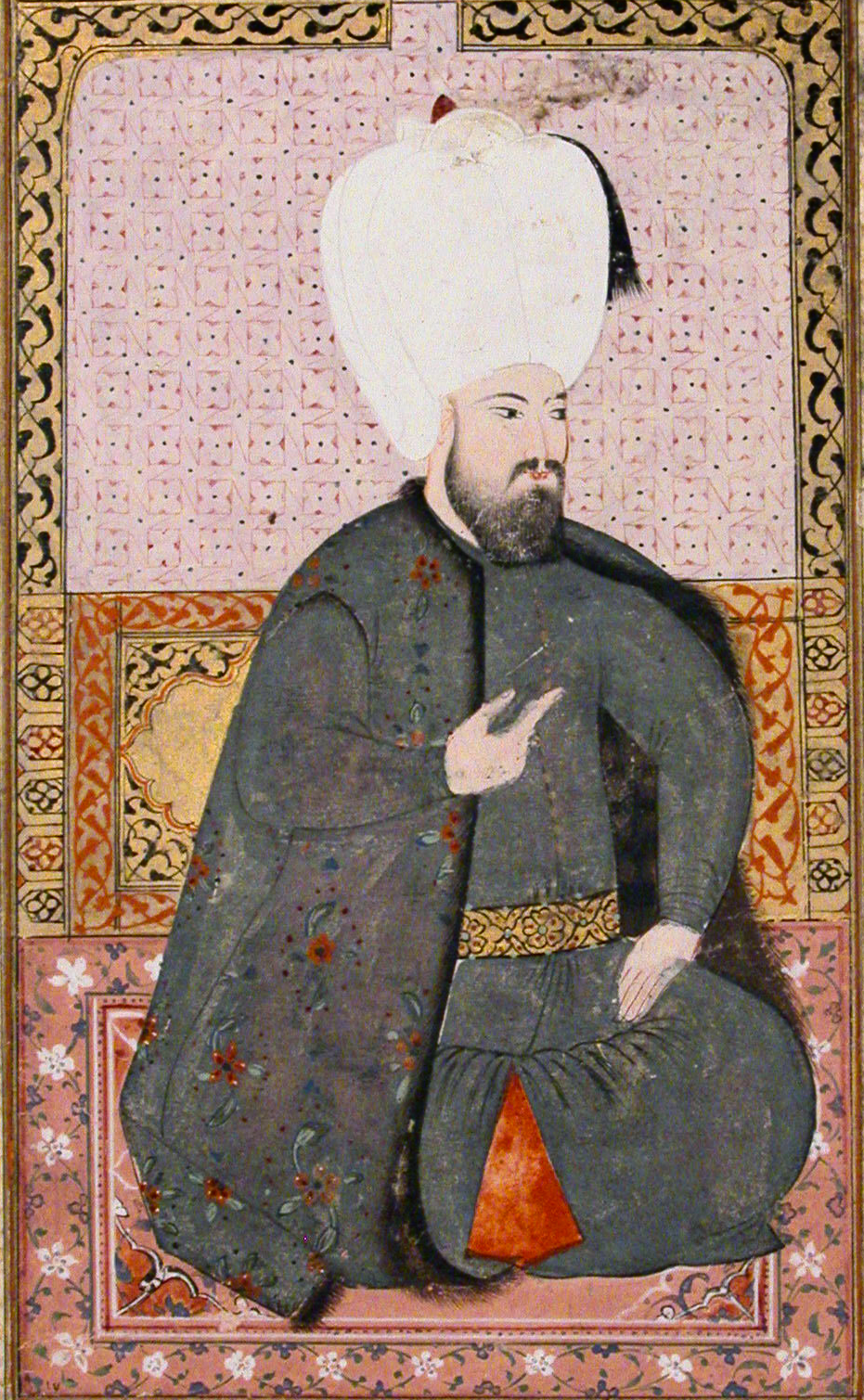
Contemporary portrait of Sultan Ahmed I, who ordered the construction of the Blue Mosque. Metropolitan Museum of Art.

After the Peace of Zsitvatorok, seen as a blow to Ottoman prestige, Sultan Ahmed I decided to build a large mosque in Istanbul in the hope of soliciting God's favour. He was the first sultan to build an imperial mosque since Selim II (d. 1574), as both Murad III and Mehmed III before him had not constructed their own.

The mosque was built on the southeast side of the old Byzantine Hippodrome, near the Hagia Sophia, which had been converted into a mosque, that acted as a source of inspiration for the Ottoman architects, a site of great symbolic significance that allows it to dominate the city's skyline. The mosque's location was originally occupied by the Hippodrome's bleachers and its imperial box (where the emperor sat when attending events here). During excavations in the early 20th century, some of the ancient seats were discovered in the mosque's courtyard. Given the mosque's location, size, and number of minarets, it is probable that Sultan Ahmed intended to create a monument that rivalled or surpassed the Hagia Sophia.

Prior to construction, this site was occupied by the palaces of several Ottoman viziers, including Sokollu Mehmet Pasha and Güzel Ahmet Pasha, which required a costly expropriation process. This, along with the fact that the empire was under economic stress, aroused the protests of the ulema (Islamic legal scholars), who argued that sultans should only fund the construction of an imperial mosque with spoils of conquest. Ahmed I had won no major victories and thus had to divert funds from the treasury for this expensive project. The ulema went so far as to forbid Muslims from praying at the mosque.

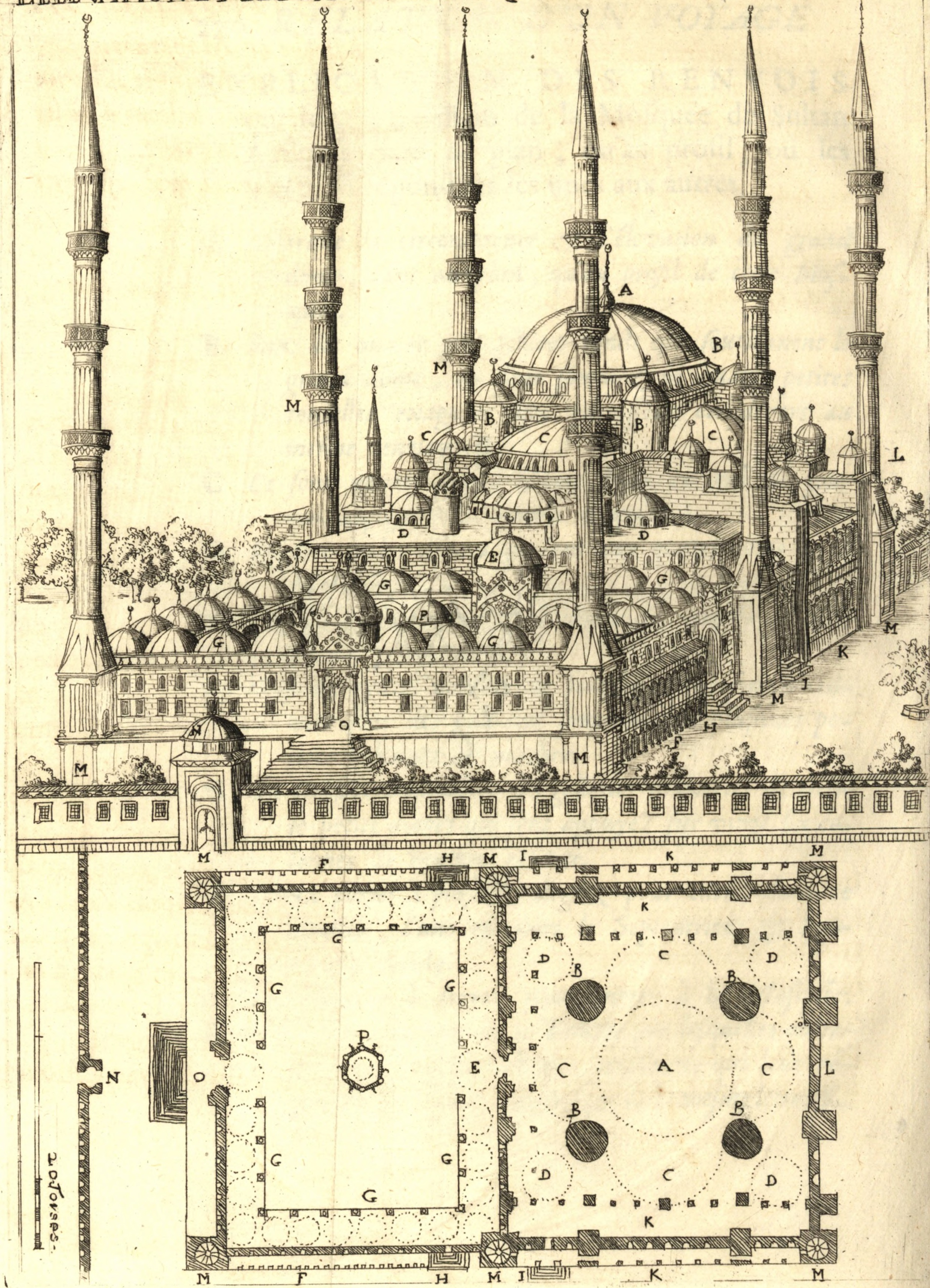
17th-century illustration with floor plan by French explorer Guillaume-Joseph Grelot

Despite the opposition, the sultan went ahead with the project. Construction started in 1609 and completed in 1617, when the opening ceremony was held, though the year 1616 is mentioned on some of the mosque's inscriptions. Ahmed I died around the same time or very soon afterwards in 1617. Scholar Godfrey Goodwin notes that the last accounting reports on the mosque's construction were signed by Mustafa I, Ahmed I's successor, which suggests that Ahmed I had died before the final completion of the project.

In the end, the mosque's grandeur, its luxurious decoration, and the elaborate public ceremonies that Ahmed I organized to celebrate the project appear to have swayed public opinion and overcome the initial controversy over its construction. It became one of the most popular mosques in the city. The mosque has left a major mark on the city and has given its name to the surrounding neighbourhood, now known as Sultanahmet.

=== Restorations and recent history ===
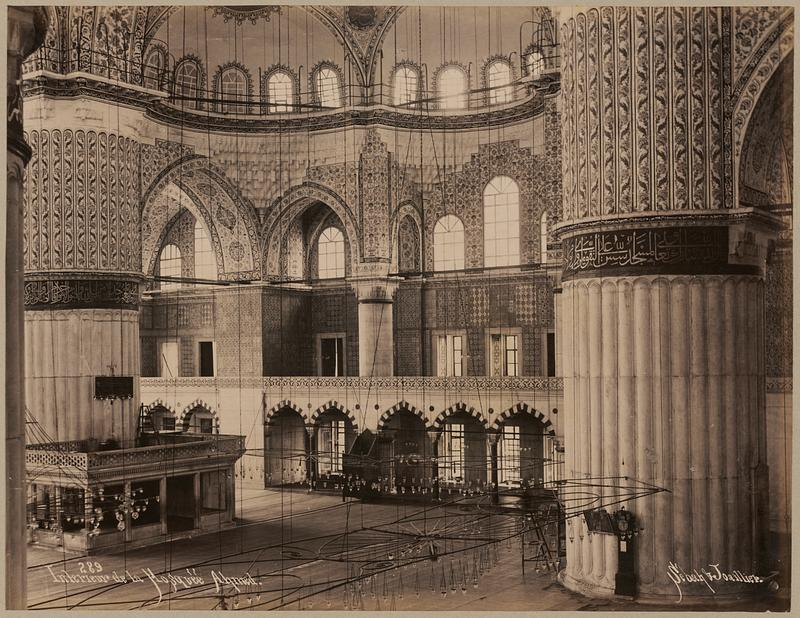
Photo of the mosque's interior c. 1900

In 1883, much of the mosque interior's painted decoration was replaced by new stenciled paintwork, some of which changed the original colour scheme. A major fire in 1912 damaged or destroyed several of the outlying structures of the mosque complex, which were subsequently restored.

A major restoration of the mosque took place in the 21st century. During preparatory work in 2013, it was discovered that the mosque's northwest minaret had shifted 5 centimetres (2.0 in) over time, constituting a potential threat to its structural stability. Work to reconstruct and repair the minaret was underway in 2015. Comprehensive restoration work on the rest of the mosque began in 2018. The mosque reopened in April 2023.

Pope Benedict XVI visited the mosque on 30 November 2006 during his visit to Turkey, alongside Mustafa Çağrıcı, the Mufti of Istanbul, and Emrullah Hatipoğlu, the Imam of the Blue Mosque. It was the second papal visit in history to a Muslim place of worship.

== Architecture ==
=== Overview ===
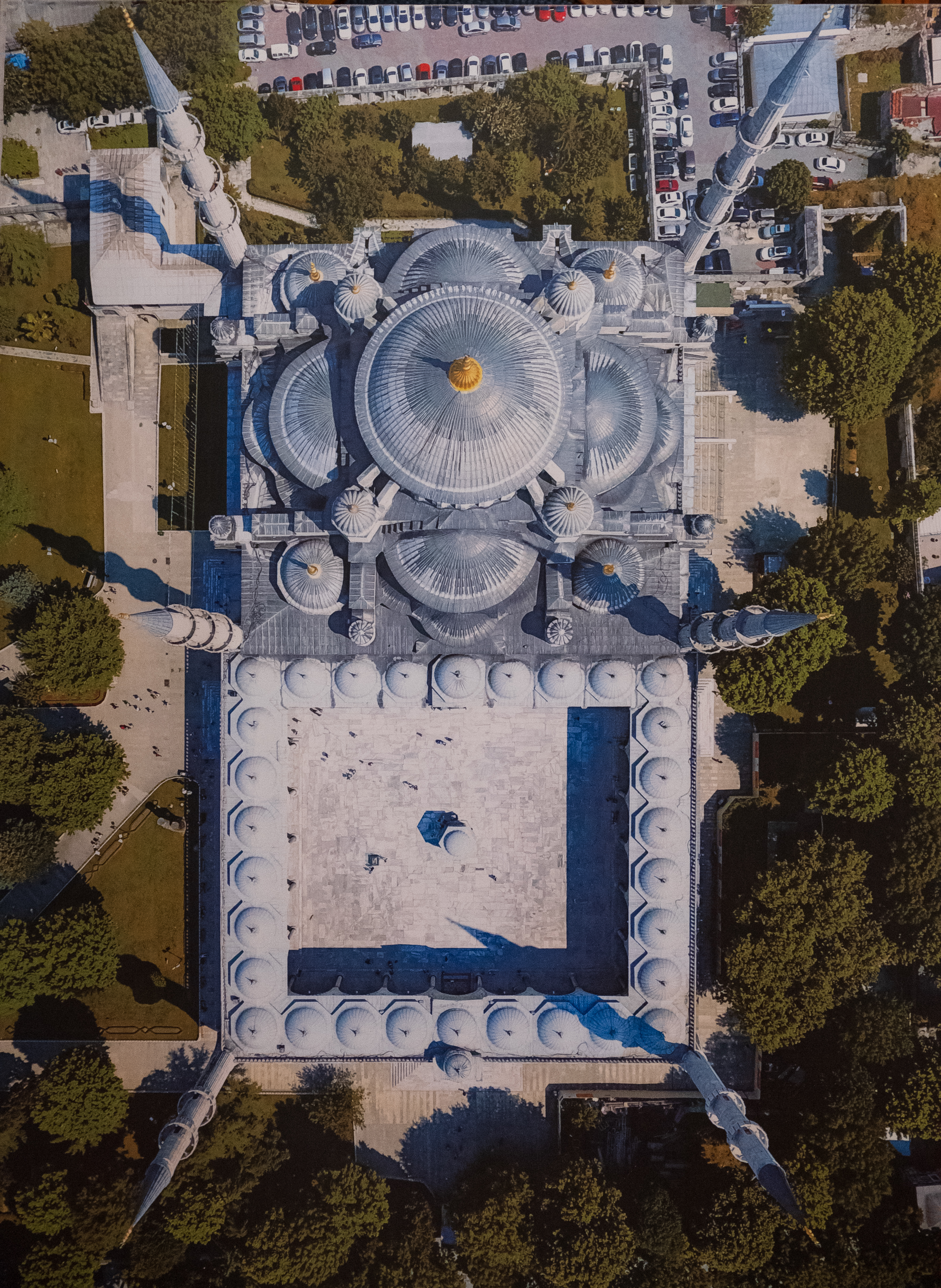
View from above, with the courtyard (bottom) and domes of the prayer hall (top)

The design of the mosque is based on that of the earlier Şehzade Mosque designed by Mimar Sinan in the early 16th century. The prayer hall occupies an area of 64 by 72 metres (210 by 236 ft) and has a central dome measuring 23.5 metres (77 ft) in diameter. The dome is surrounded by four semi-domes, each of which is flanked by three smaller semi-domes or exedrae. Four smaller domes cover the corners of the prayer hall. On the outside, the mosque has six minarets, ablutions facilities, and a large courtyard preceding the prayer hall.

The mosque's architect, Sedefkar Mehmed Agha from Elbasan who also built the Ballie Mosque there, synthesized the ideas of his master Sinan, aiming for overwhelming size, majesty and splendor. According to the architect's official biographer, the mosque was the culmination of his career. Reflecting the classical Ottoman style of the period, the structure incorporates aspects of Byzantine architecture from the neighboring Hagia Sophia with Islamic architecture. It was the last great mosque of this classical period.

Architectural historian Doğan Kuban characterizes Mehmed Agha's style as having a more "sculptural" approach, with more attention brought on the details of the building and a willingness to break up its elements into smaller parts, whereas Sinan had placed more emphasis on rigorous spatial designs with relatively restrained decoration. Scholar Gülru Necipoğlu states that the mosque demonstrates an emerging trend towards extravagance in the structure and decoration of Ottoman buildings during this time, as evidenced by its size, its profile (including the increased number of minarets), and its lavish use of Iznik tiles. A similar lack of restraint in decoration is also found, for example, in the New Mosque (or Yeni Valide Mosque) that was completed later that same century.

While architectural historians have criticized some details of the mosque's structure and decoration when comparing it to the earlier works of Sinan, (Note: Godfrey Goodwin, for example, argues that the four supporting pillars inside the prayer hall are overly large in comparison with the dome, which is proportionally smaller than it could have been for such a large building. He remarks that the softer, multi-tiered build-up of curved elements towards the central dome gives the mosque a "logical and graceful" profile, but that it also reduces the main dome's dramatic effect, by contrast with the Süleymaniye Mosque designed by Sinan, where the central dome is a "dramatic climax and not merely the top of a pile".) the mosque is one of the most impressive and popularly admired monuments of Ottoman architecture.

=== Interior ===
==== Layout and main features ====
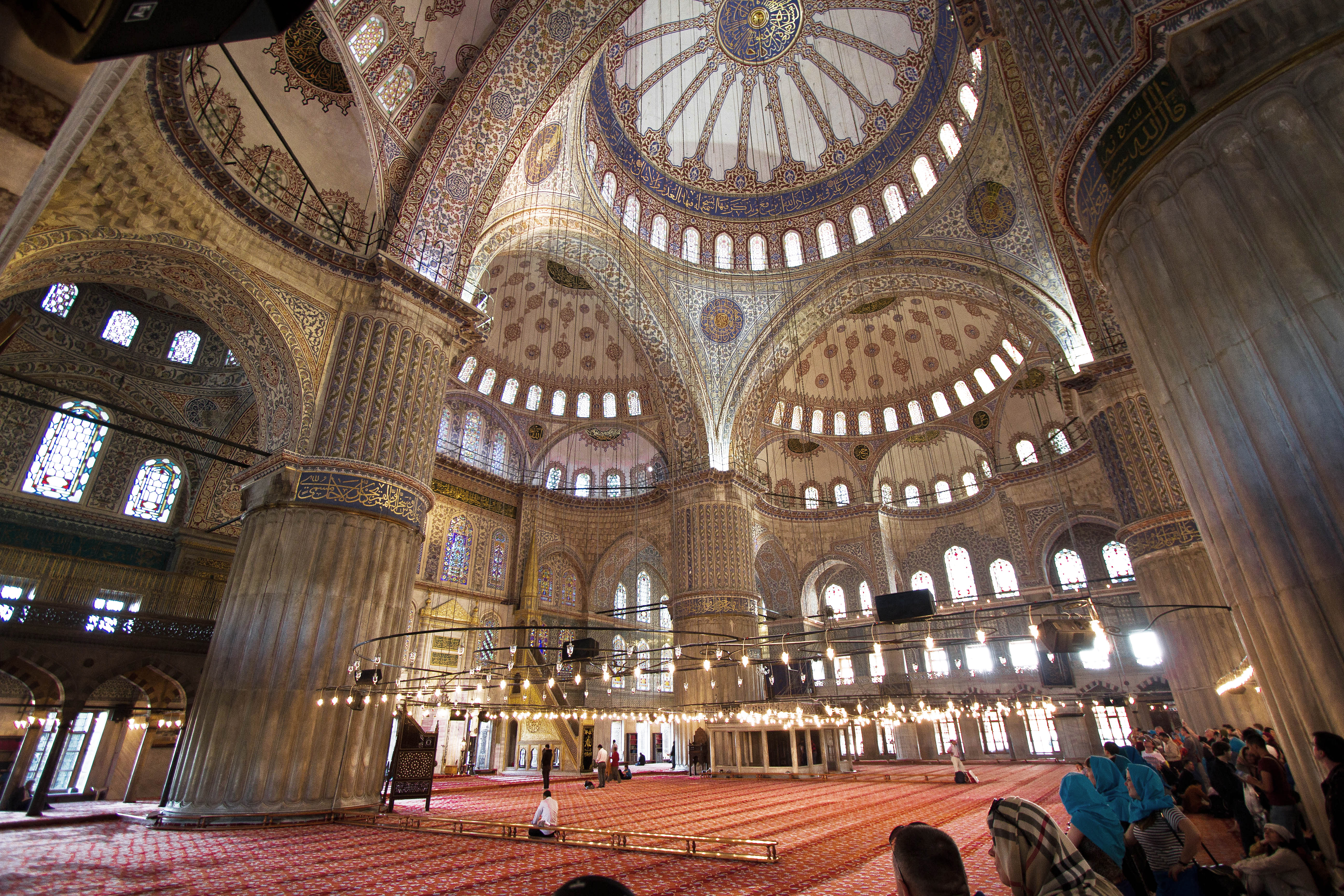
General view of the interior

The mosque's interior is dominated by its dome and cascading semi-domes. The main dome reaches a height of 43 metres (141 ft). The weight of the dome is supported by four massive cylindrical pillars. The transition between the central dome and the pillars is achieved by four long, smooth pendentives. Smaller pendentives are used for transitions between the semi-domes and their exedrae and between the hall's corner domes and the surrounding structure. The transitions between the smaller exedrae and the supporting walls or arches are covered by muqarnas (stalactite-like sculpting) made of stucco. By employing these elements, Mehmed Agha created a softer progression from the rectangular outer walls to the round central dome. A two-floor gallery, supported on columns, runs along three sides of the prayer hall, except for the southeastern (or qibla) side, where the mihrab is located. Two fountains are incorporated into the two northern pillars of the mosque, similar to the Süleymaniye Mosque's prayer hall. The floors are covered with carpets, which are donated by the faithful and are regularly replaced as they wear out.

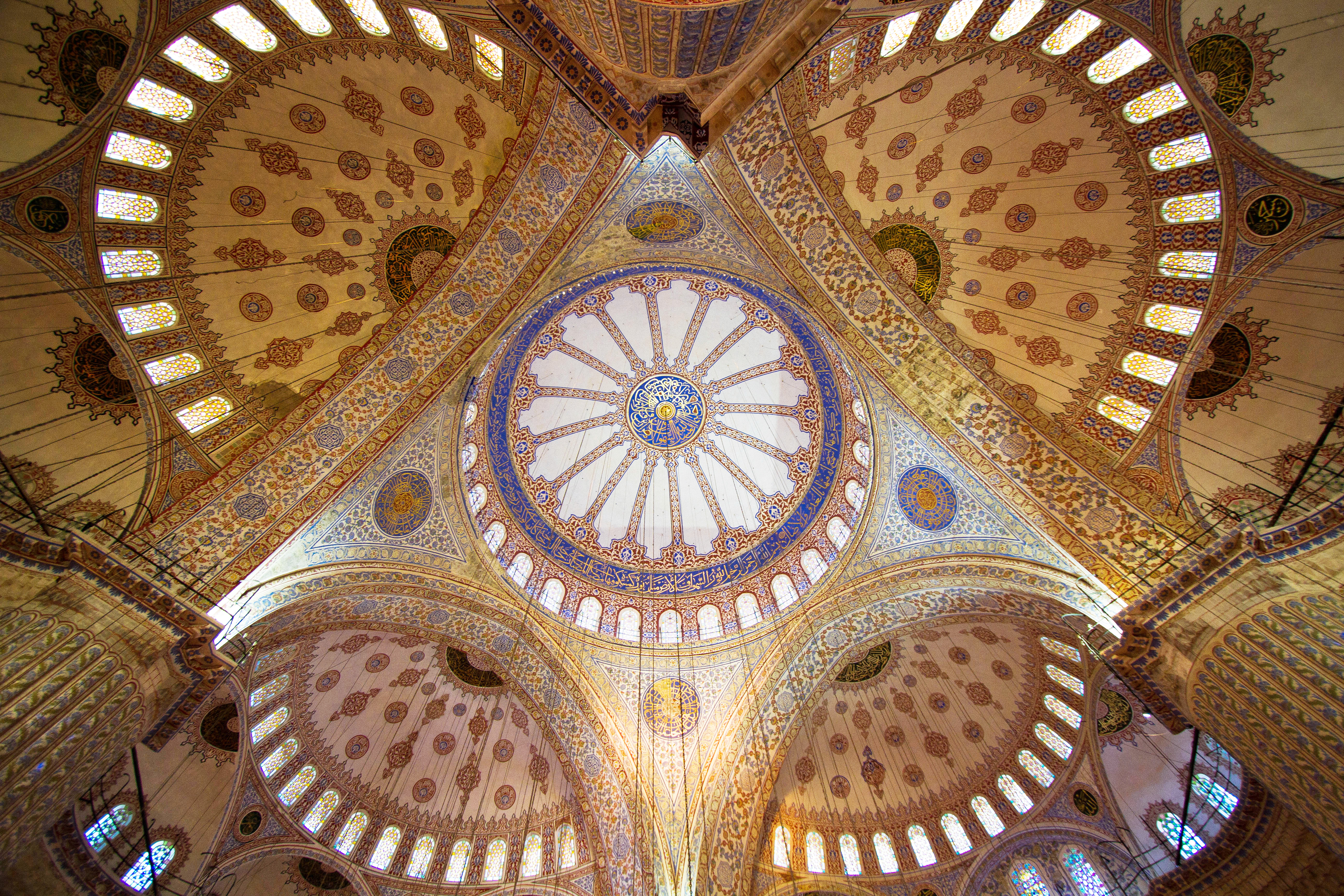
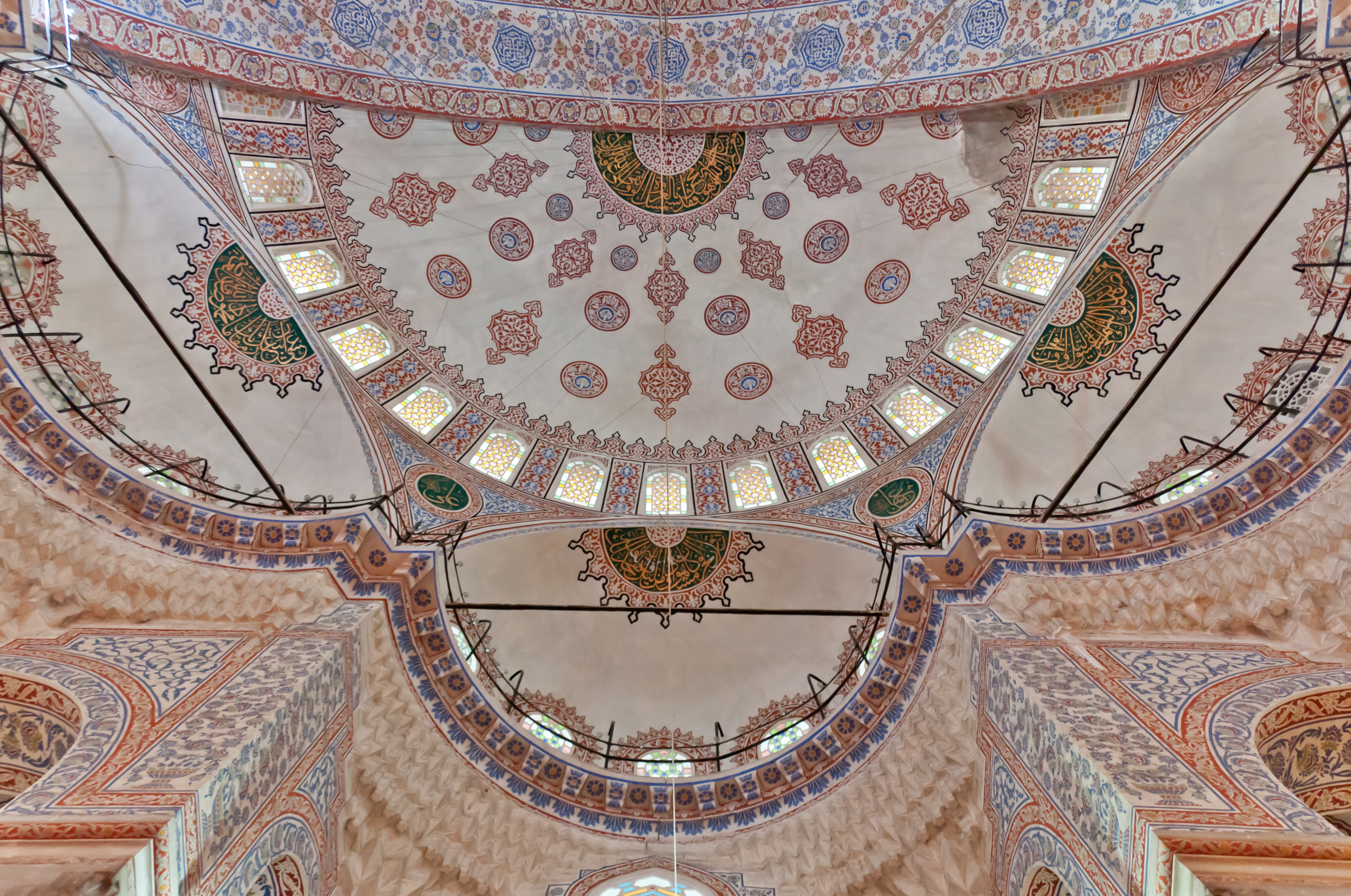
View of the central dome and main semi-domes (left), and detail of a semi-dome and its three exedrae (right)

At ground level, the focus of the prayer hall is the mihrab, which is made of finely carved marble, with a muqarnas niche and two inscription panels above it. It is surrounded by many windows. To the right of the mihrab is the richly decorated minbar, or pulpit, where the imam stands when he is delivering his sermon at the time of noon prayer on Fridays or on holy days. The minbar is crafted from elaborately carved marble, with a summit covered by a gold-covered conical cap. The mosque has been designed so that even when it is at its most crowded, everyone in the mosque can see and hear the imam, with the exception of the areas behind the mosque's large pillars. According to Evliya Çelebi, who saw the mosque in the 17th century, a hundred Qur'ans on lecterns inlaid with mother-of-pearl, all gifted by sultans and viziers, were placed near the mihrab.

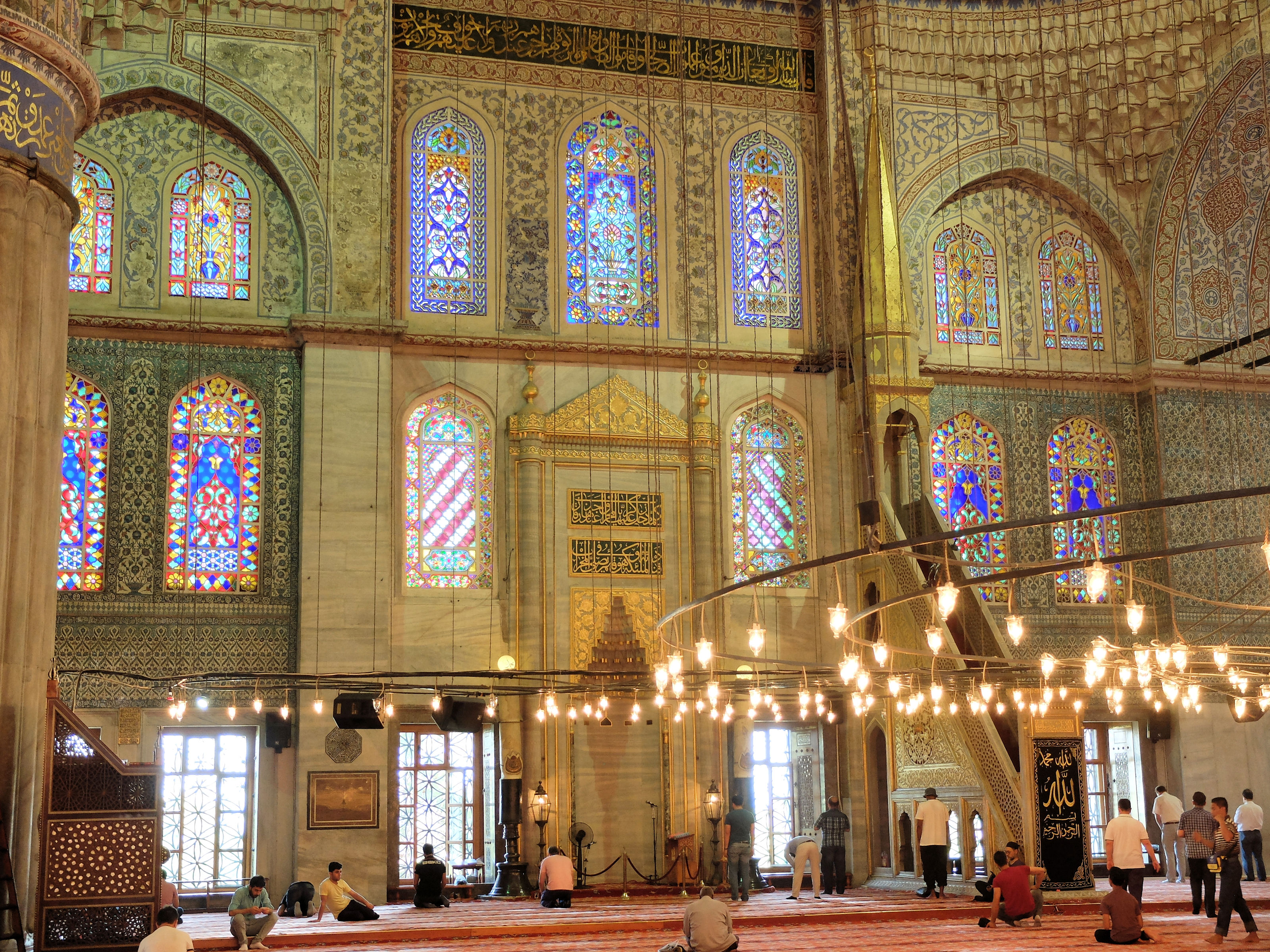
The mihrab (center) and minbar (right)

The hünkâr mahfil, or sultan's loge, is an elevated platform situated in the southeast corner of the prayer hall, where the sultan could pray. The platform has an L-shape and is supported on ten marble columns. It has its own mihrab with rich decoration, which used to include gold leaf and a jade rose. The loge is reached from the outside via an "imperial pavilion", a large L-shaped structure composed of a covered ramp leading up to two rooms where the sultan could retire to rest, along with an enclosed portico or balcony on the south side overlooking the sea. These retiring rooms became the headquarters of the Grand Vizier during the suppression of the rebellious Janissary Corps in 1826. This auxiliary structure, which is awkwardly integrated into the overall mosque design, is an innovation that appears here for the first time in Ottoman architecture. It was partly destroyed by a fire in 1912 and was subsequently restored.

==== Decoration ====
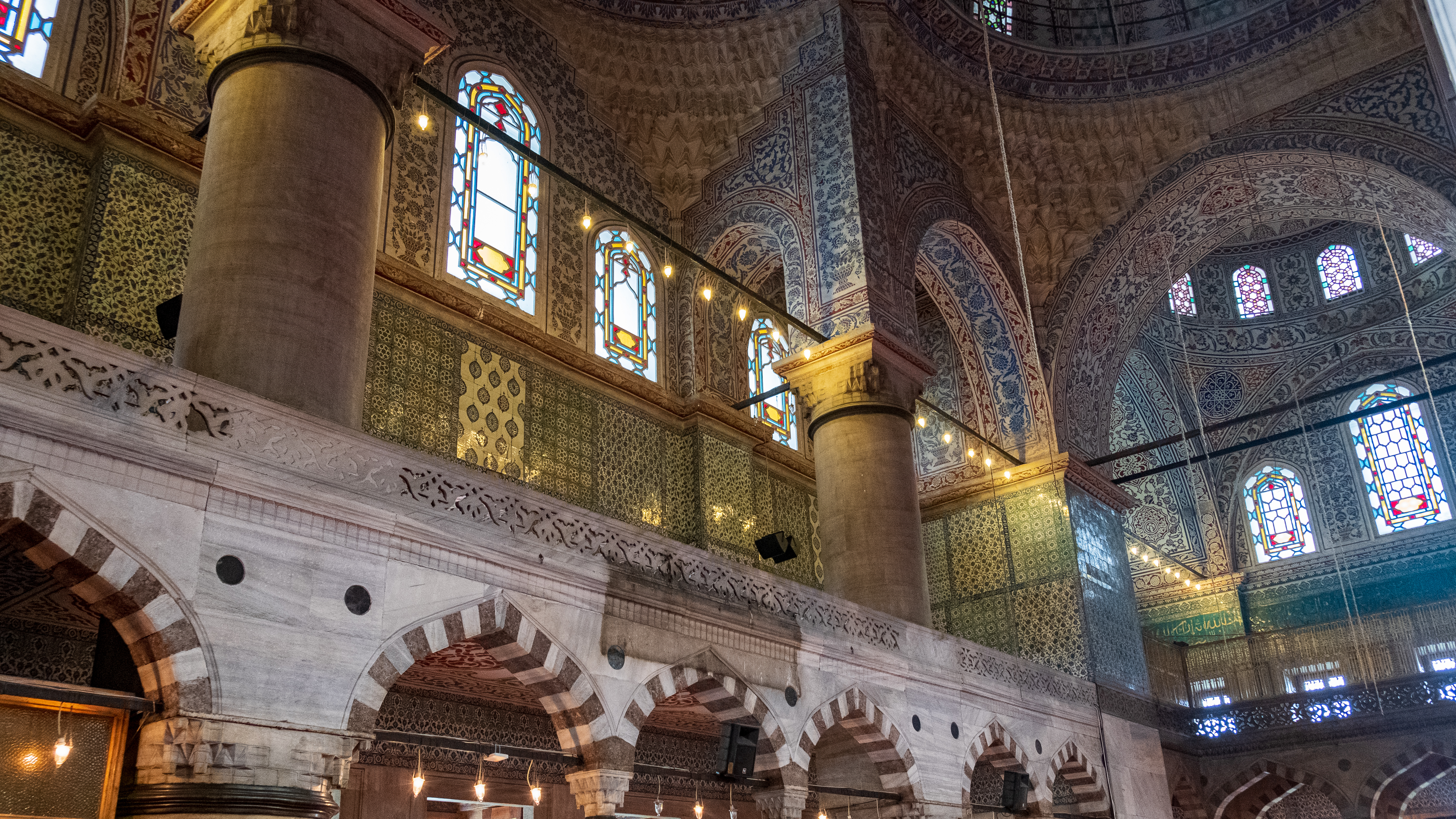
View of northern gallery, where much of the Iznik tilework is concentrated

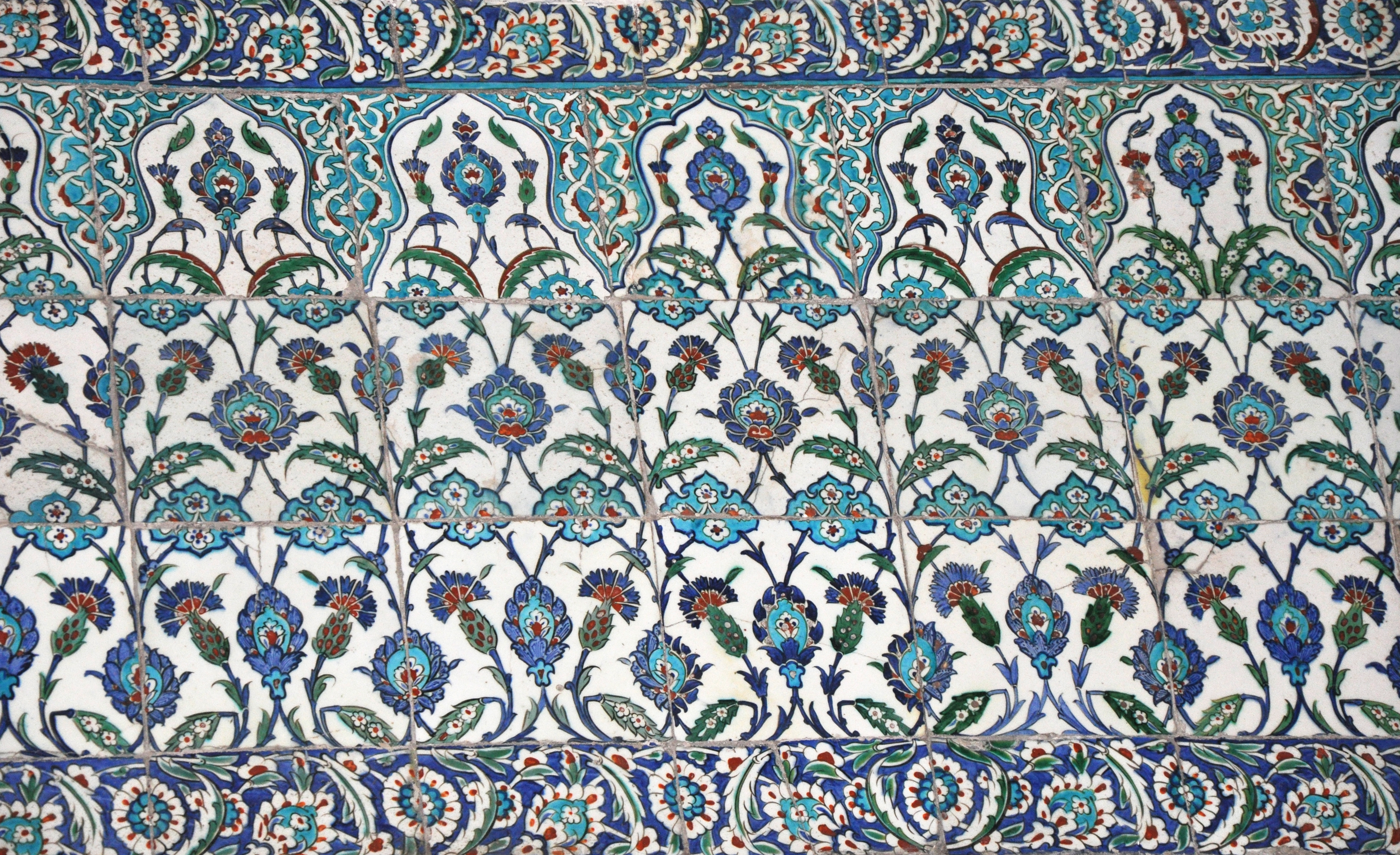
Close-up of tiles under the galleries

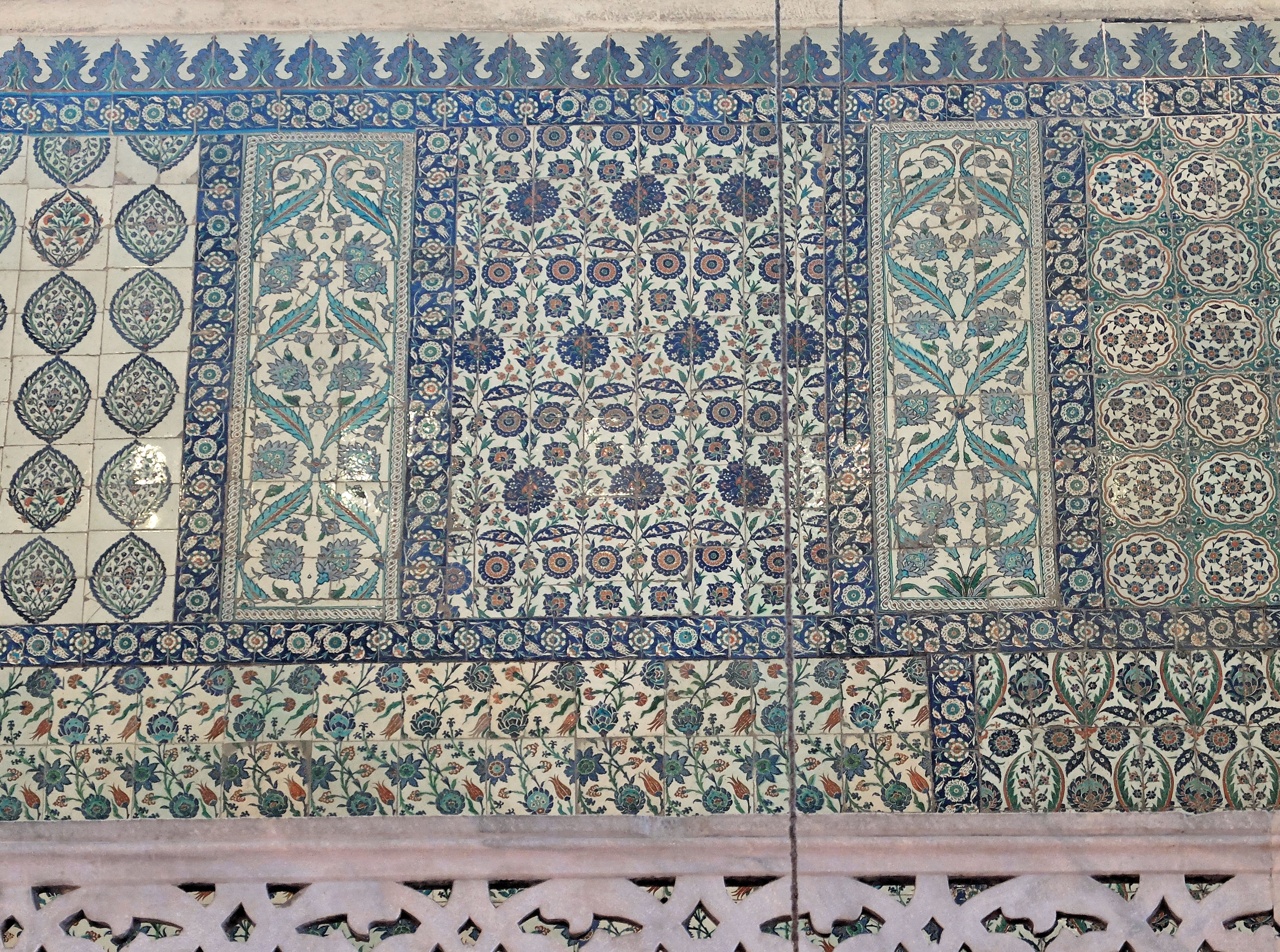
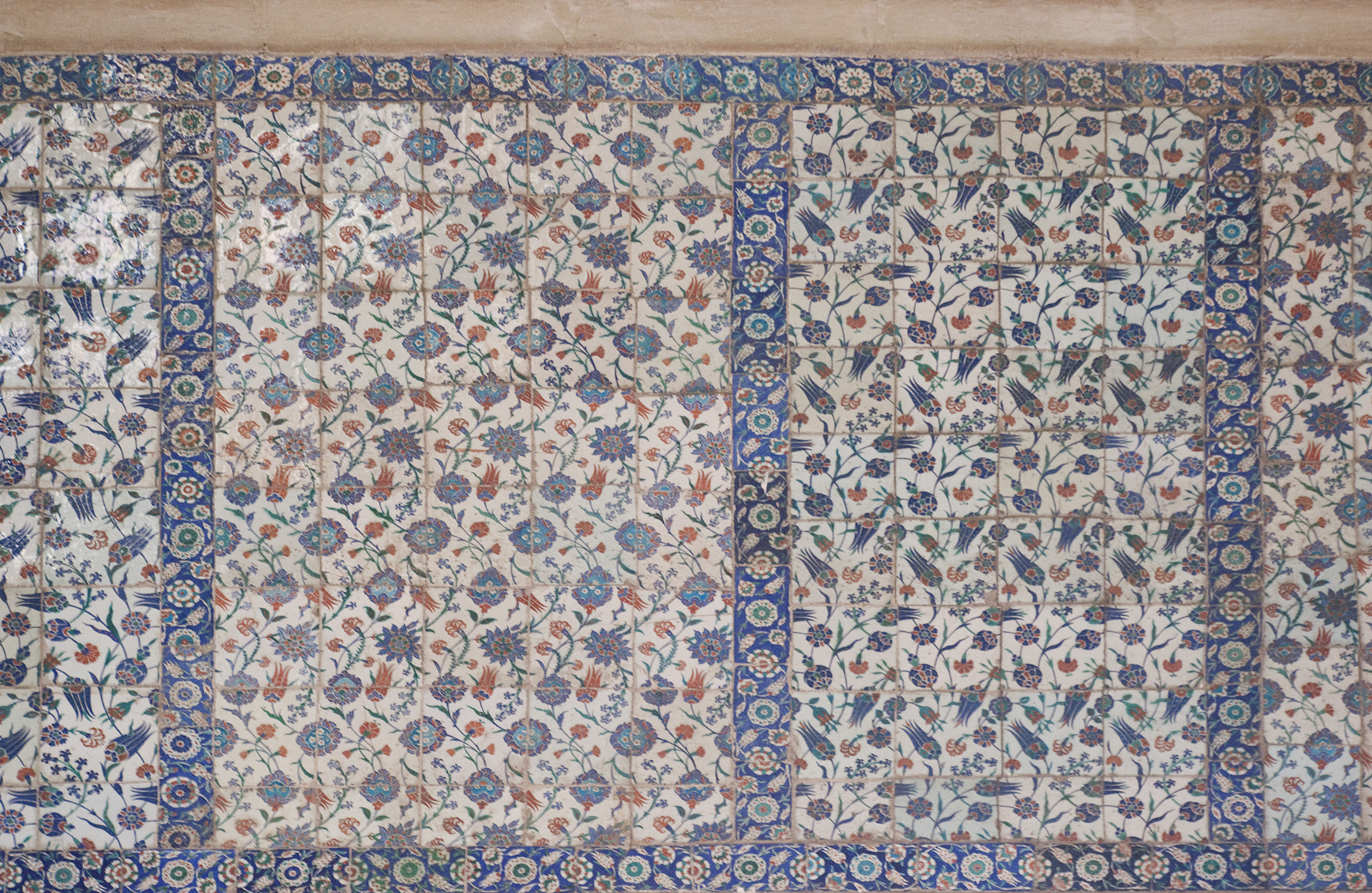
Some of the Iznik tile panels along the north gallery

The lower walls of the mosque, especially around the galleries, are covered in Iznik tiles, a style of tilework named after their main production center, İznik (ancient Nicaea). Ahmed I had a great appreciation for these tiles and the production of tiles for his mosque occupied the entire Iznik industry during its construction. Starting in 1607, orders for tiles were sent out continuously and in 1613 the sultan even forbade the production and sale of tiles for any other purpose, so that his own commissions could be completed on time.

A total of 21,043 tiles, featuring over fifty different designs, are found inside the mosque. Some panels were designed specifically for the mosque, while others seem to have been reused from other buildings and amassed here, including lower-quality tiles added during later repairs. The finest tiles are found on the walls of the upper gallery on the north wall, though these are difficult for most visitors to see today. They constitute a virtual museum of tile design from this period, with motifs including cypress trees, flowers, and fruit in a range of colours including blue, green, red, black, and turquoise.

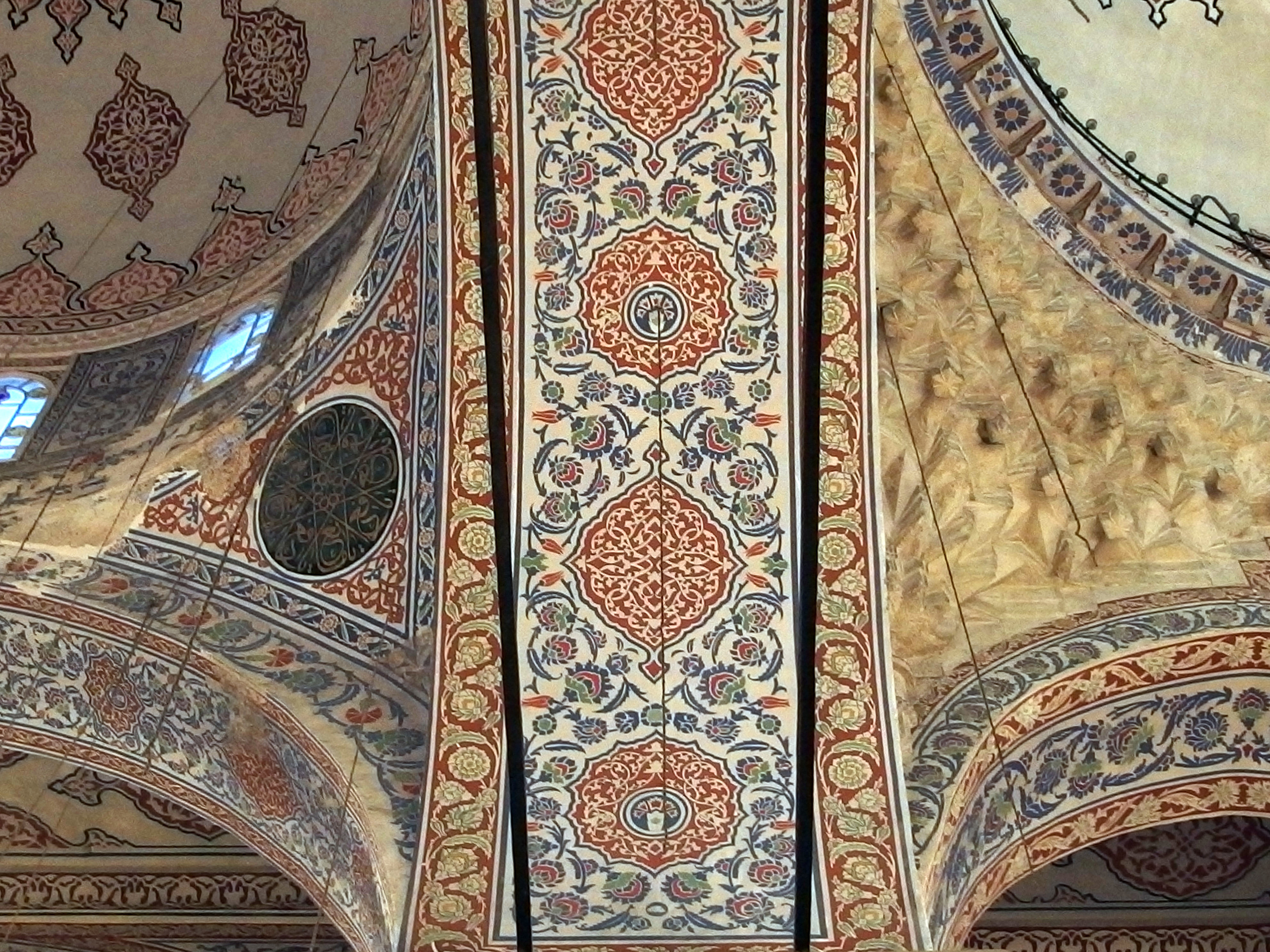
Example of painted decoration

Nearly 75 percent of the mosque's walls, above the level of the tilework, are decorated with painted motifs. The predominant colour of this paintwork is blue, one of the reasons for the mosque's popular name, though much of it has since been replaced with modern imitations of the original 16th/17th-century style. The painted motifs generally consist of floral arabesques. Other motifs include calligraphic inscriptions, including verses from the Qur'an, originally made by the famous calligrapher Seyyid Kasim Gubari, but these too have been restored repeatedly and no longer match the original calligrapher's work.

Some opus sectile decoration is also used at floor level. The mosque also contains some original inlaid woodwork of high quality, including the doors of the courtyard entrance, which were made by the father of Evliya Çelebi.

The mosque contains some 260 windows to admit natural light. Each semi-dome has 14 windows and the central dome 28 (four of which are blind). Each smaller exedra of the semi-domes has five windows, some of which are blind. Many of the windows were made in a traditional manner with intricate designs created with small pieces of coloured glass. Some of the glass was manufactured locally for the outer windows, but most of the glass, especially the coloured glass, was imported. Some of it was a gift from the Signoria of Venice, following a request from Ahmed I in 1610. Most of these original windows have been lost and since replaced with less elaborate modern windows. The modern windows probably make the mosque's interior today brighter than the original stained glass windows would have.

The mosque is further illuminated by chandeliers hung from the ceiling. The many lamps inside the mosque were once covered with gold and gems. Among the lamps one could find ostrich eggs and crystal balls. Adding ostrich eggs to chandeliers was a frequent traditional practice in mosques and Near Eastern churches. It is popularly explained in Istanbul as a method to ward off spiders or mice, or to warn of earthquakes. Some of the crystal balls or glass bowls also contained other curiosities, such as a model of the mosque and a model of a galley, noted by 17th and 18th century writers.

=== Exterior ===
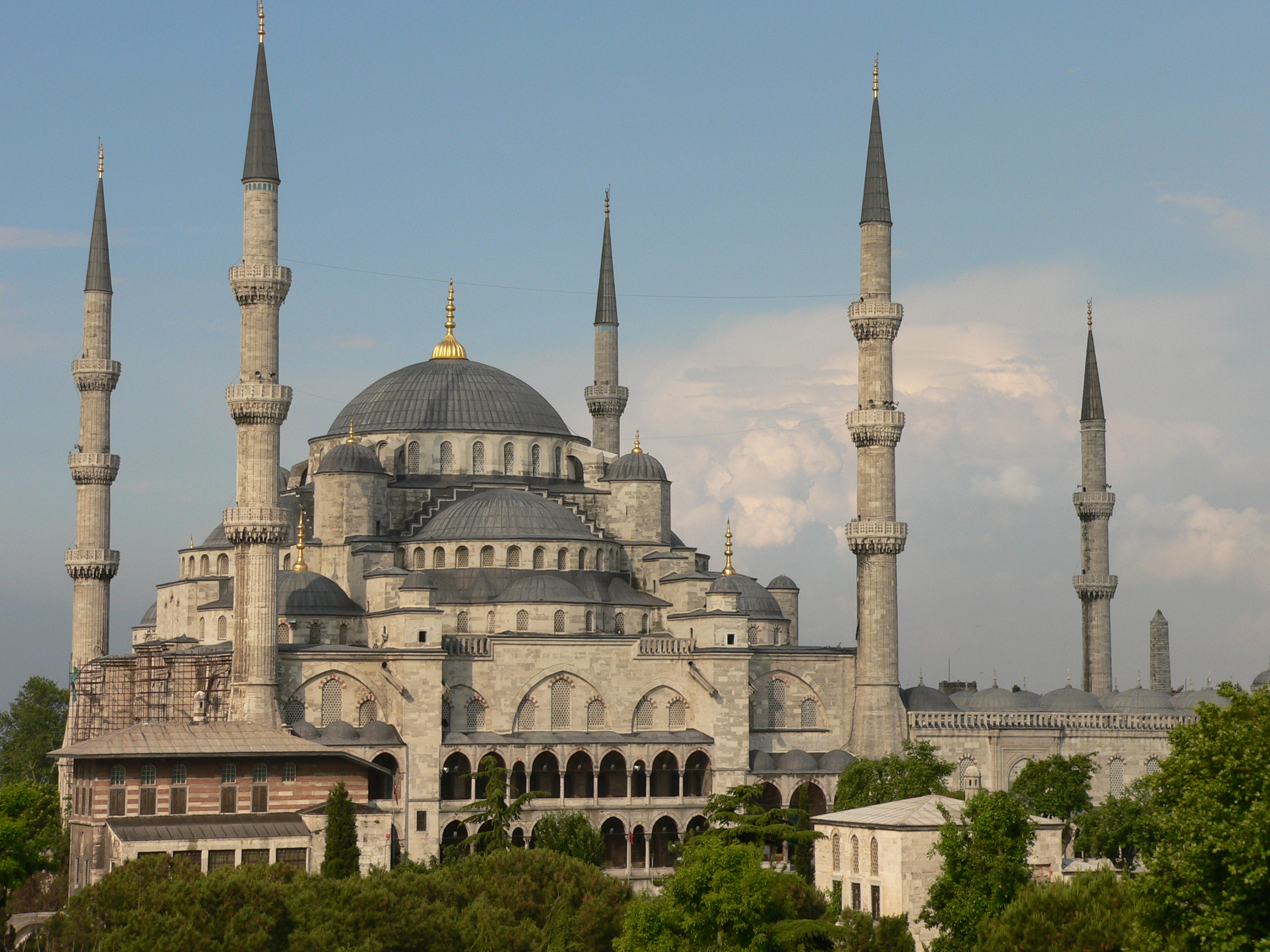
View from the east. The courtyard walls are visible on the right and the sultan's imperial pavilion is visible on the lower left.

On the outside, Mehmed Agha used the cascade of domes and semi-domes, combined with more curved and multi-tiered supported elements, to create a softer profile that builds up smoothly towards the summit of the central dome, much like he did with the interior. This approach differs slightly from that of Sinan and earlier Ottoman architects, who used the deliberate juxtaposition of curved domes and vertical elements to create a more dramatic effect.

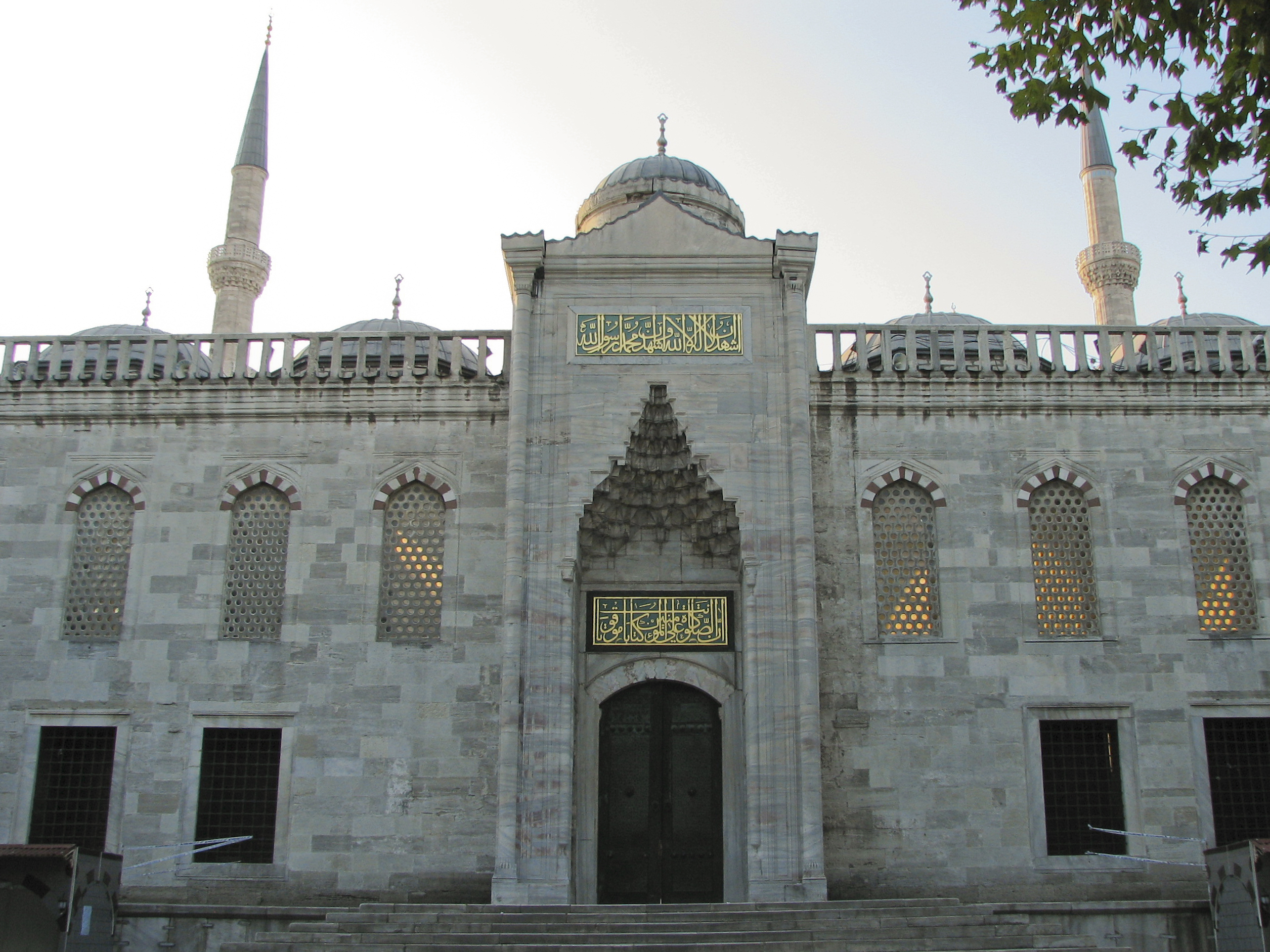
The central entrance to the courtyard on the northwest side

The courtyard of the mosque has three entrances: a central entrance on the northwest and two other side entrances. The central entrance is the most monumental, featuring a tall projecting portal topped by a small dome raised on a drum. A muqarnas semi-vault is set over the exterior doorway and there are two inscription panels. From the courtyard, the prayer hall is also entered via a monumental gate on the southeast side, decorated with its own muqarnas semi-vault and inscription panel. The prayer hall also has two other lateral entrances on the outside of the mosque, where non-Muslim tourists usually enter today.

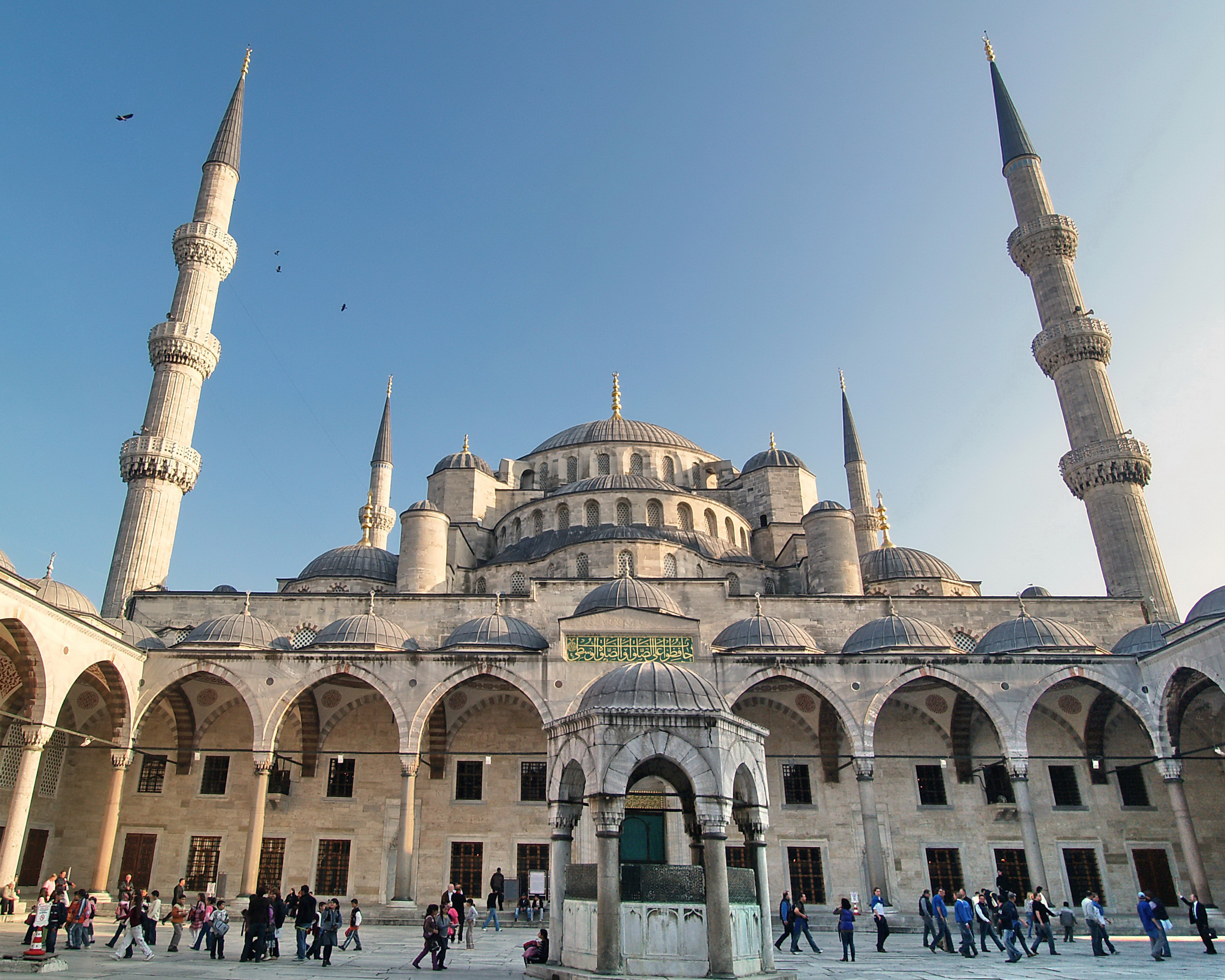
Courtyard, with the shadirvan in the center

On the inside, the mosque courtyard has a classic rectangular peristyle form, lined on each side with an arcaded and domed portico (or riwaq). There are a total of 26 columns supporting the porticos and 30 domes above them. Unlike the courtyards of the Süleymaniye Mosque and Selimiye Mosque designed by Sinan, where the portico in front of the prayer hall is taller than those on the other three sides, Mehmet Agha kept the arches of the southeast portico level almost with the others, thus prioritizing greater uniformity.

At the center of the courtyard is the shadirvan, an octagonal domed kiosk sheltering a fountain that was used for ablutions. The outer surfaces of the kiosk are carved with low-relief foliate motifs. Today, Muslim ablutions are not performed at this fountain but at a series of water taps available outside the courtyard, along the northeast and southwest walls. The inclusion of these taps under arcaded galleries along the outer walls of the courtyard was an innovative feature.

A heavy iron chain hangs in the northwestern entrance (from the Hippodrome) to the outer precinct of the mosque. Only the sultan was allowed to enter the court of the mosque on horseback. The chain was put there, so that the sultan had to lower his head every single time he entered the court to avoid being hit. This was a symbolic gesture, to ensure the humility of the ruler in the face of the divine.

=== Minarets ===
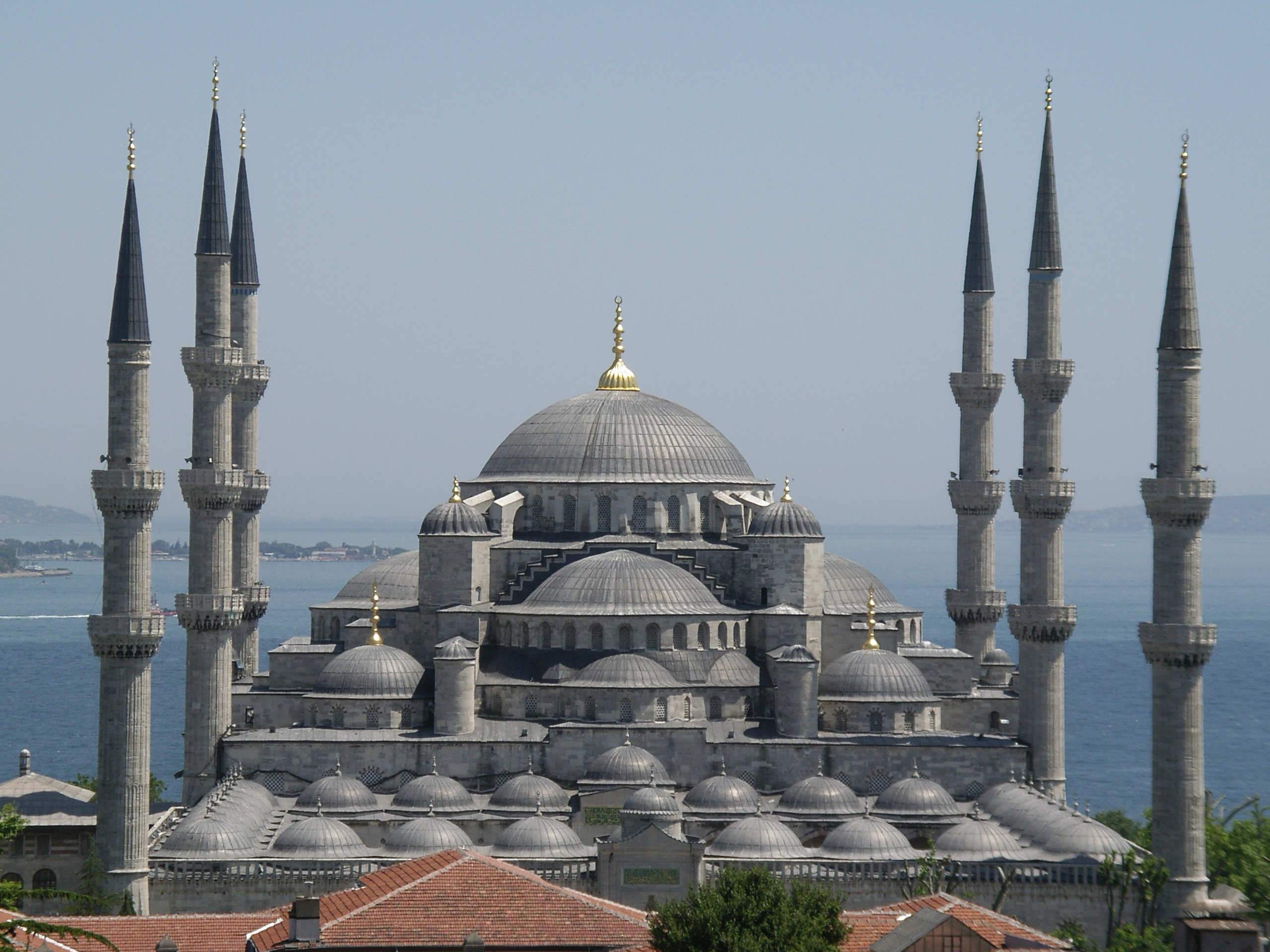
Minarets

The Blue Mosque is one of the five mosques in Turkey that has six minarets (one in the modern Sabancı Mosque in Adana, the Muğdat Mosque in Mersin, Çamlıca Mosque in Üsküdar and the Green mosque in Arnavutköy).

According to folklore, an architect misheard the Sultan's request for "altın minareler" (gold minarets) as "altı minare" (six minarets), a feature supposedly then-unique to the mosque of the Ka'aba in Mecca. When criticized for his presumption, the legend says, the Sultan then ordered a seventh minaret to be built at the Mecca mosque. This story, although widely repeated, is apocryphal.

Each of the six minaret towers is fluted and is topped by a slender, conical cap. The four minarets rising at the corners of the prayer hall each have three balconies (şerefe) while the other two at the outer corners of the courtyard have two balconies each. Each balcony is supported by muqarnas-carved corbeling. The minarets have been repaired many times in their history. Historically, the muezzin had to climb a narrow spiral staircase inside the minarets five times a day to announce the call to prayer.

== Other parts of the complex ==
As in most major Ottoman religious foundations, the Sultan Ahmed Mosque is the main element of a larger complex of buildings. Unlike in previous imperial mosque complexes, the other structures of this complex are not arranged in a regular, well-organized plan around the mosque. Because the mosque was built next to the Hippodrome, the site created difficulties for a planned complex and the auxiliary buildings were instead placed in various locations near the mosque or around the Hippodrome. The mosque is surrounded by an outer court or precinct enclosed by a wall.

=== Mausoleum of Ahmed I ===
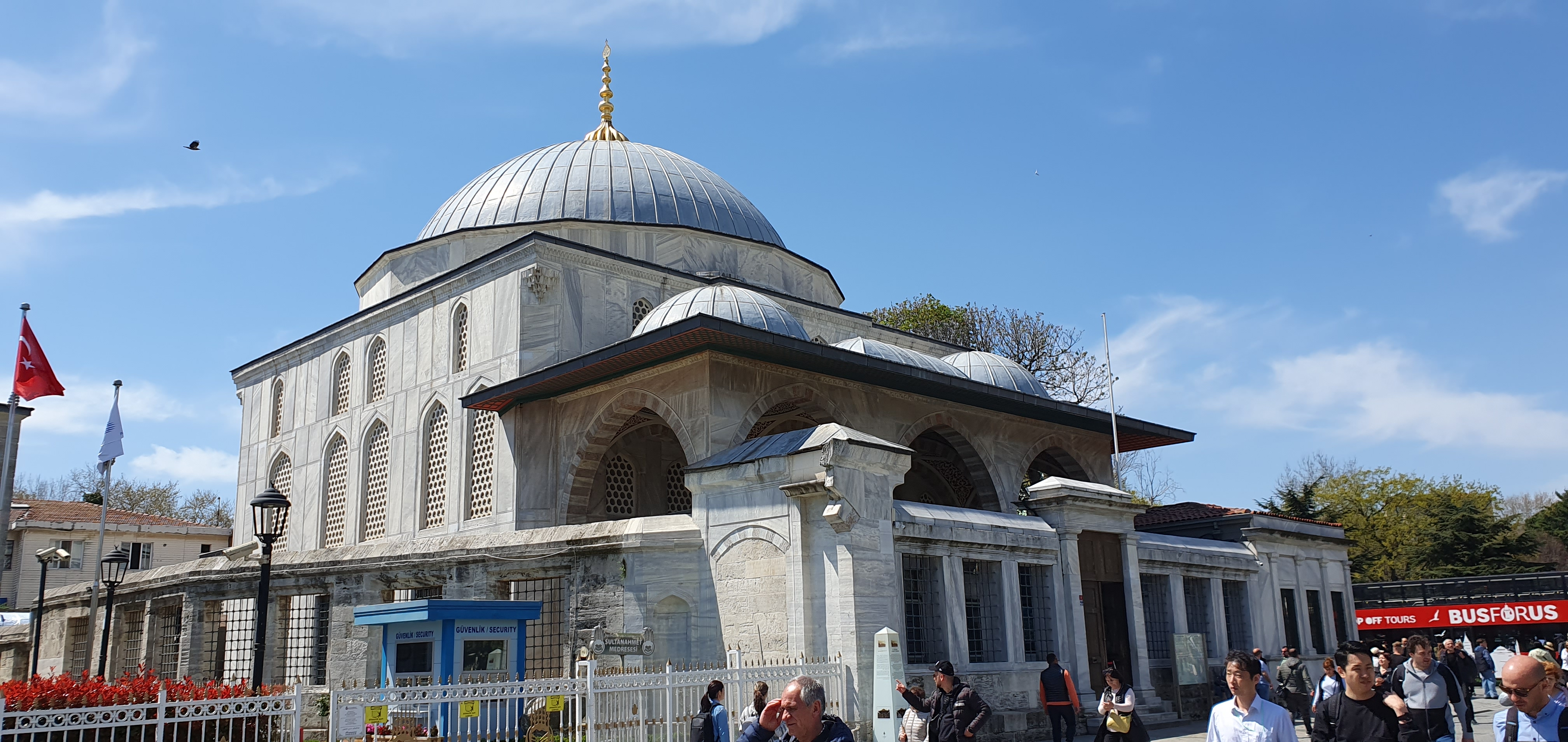
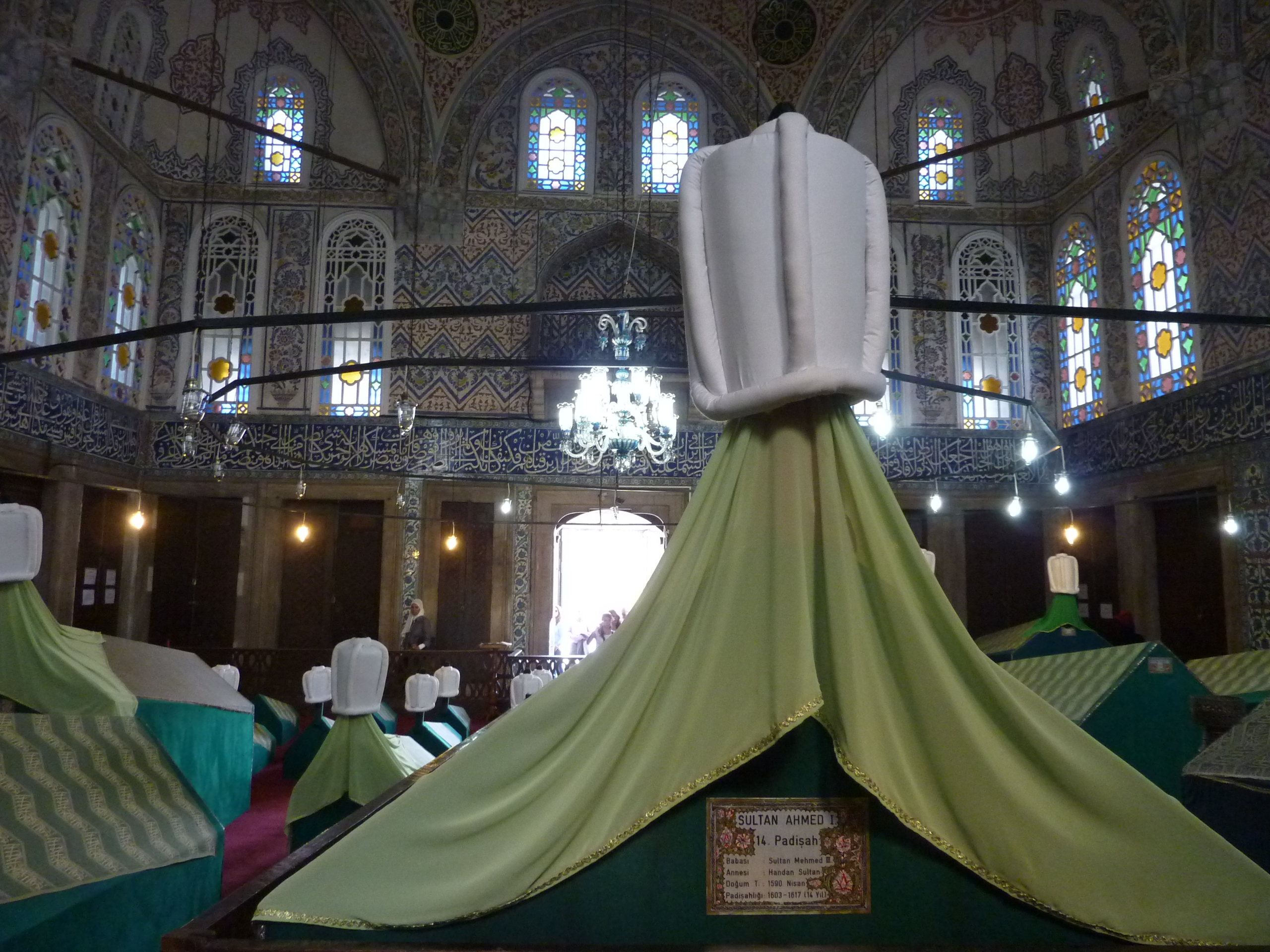
The exterior (above) and interior (below) of Sultan Ahmed I's mausoleum

The mausoleum of Ahmed I is located northeast of the mosque, next to the Hippodrome square. It was begun in 1619 after Ahmed's death, and completed by his son, Osman II (r. 1618–1622). Unlike many Ottoman mausoleums, which most typically have an octagonal form, the tomb chamber has a square floor plan covered by a dome, more reminiscent of a small mosque. The dome has a diameter of 15 metres. There is a small rectangular alcove at the back of the chamber whose original purpose is uncertain. The tomb is fronted by a portico with three arches. Inside are the tombs of Sultan Ahmed I and some of his family, including his wife Kösem and four of his sons, Sultan Osman II, Sultan Murad IV (r. 1623–1640), Şehzade Mehmed (d. 1621) and Şehzade Bayezid (d. 1635).

=== Madrasa ===
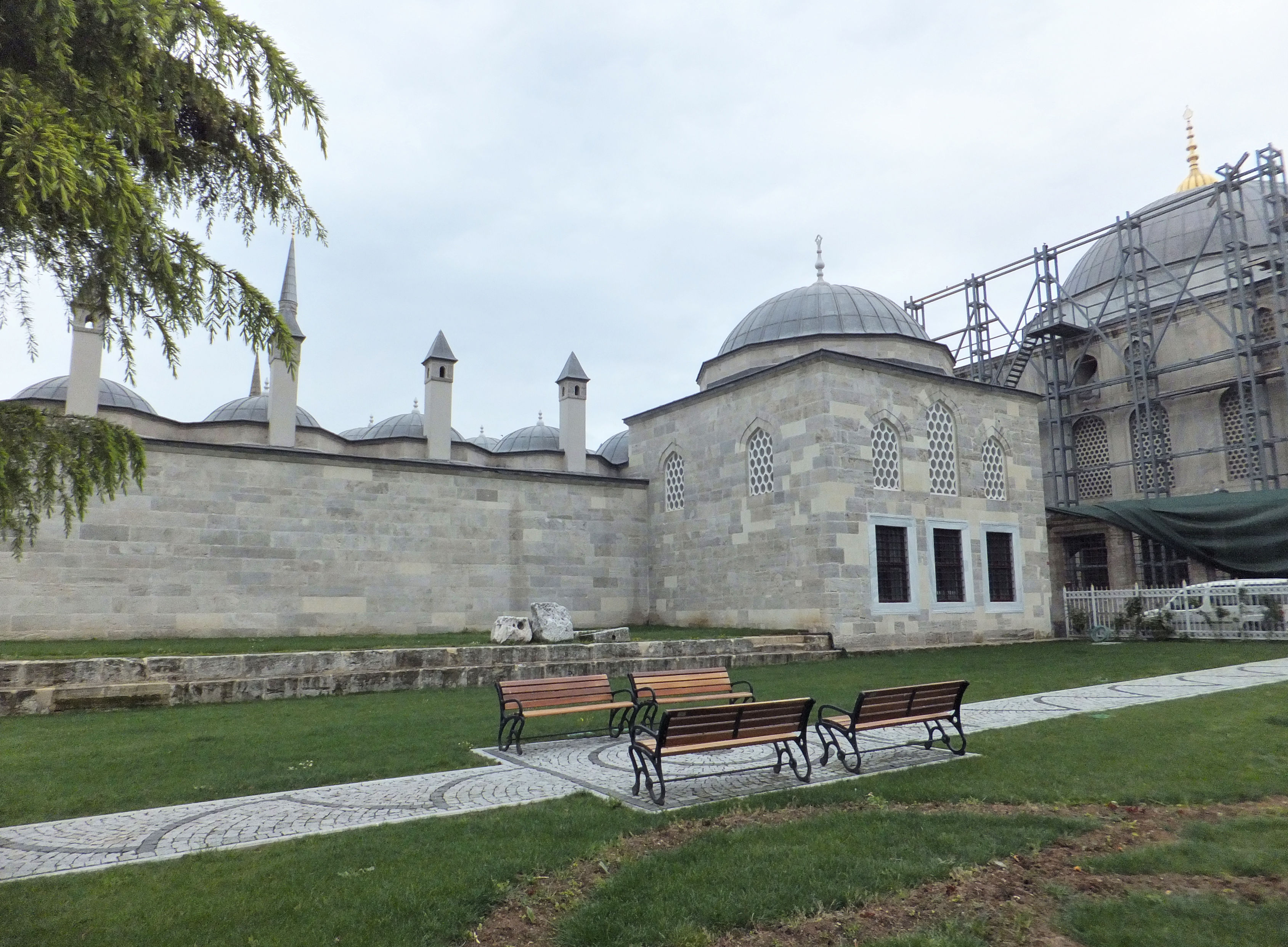
The madrasa of the complex, including the dershane (classroom) on the right

The madrasa of the complex is located just outside the outer wall of the mosque's precinct, to the northeast. It was probably completed towards 1620. The madrasa has a generally classical layout, consisting of a rectangular courtyard surrounded on all four sides by an arcaded and domed portico. Behind each portico is a row of domed rooms that served as student sleeping quarters, with 24 rooms in total. The main features that depart from the design of earlier madrasas are the lack of a monumental entrance portal and the placement of the dershane (a larger domed chamber serving as a classroom), which is attached to a corner of the building rather than placed in the middle of one side. The madrasa is entered via a more discrete doorway on the northwest side, behind the outer garden wall of the nearby mausoleum.

A separate square structure, the darülkurra (a school that teaches reading of the Qur'an), is contained within the outer enclosure of the nearby mausoleum. It was restored in 1935 and is currently used as a storage for Ottoman archives.

=== The hospital and public kitchen ===
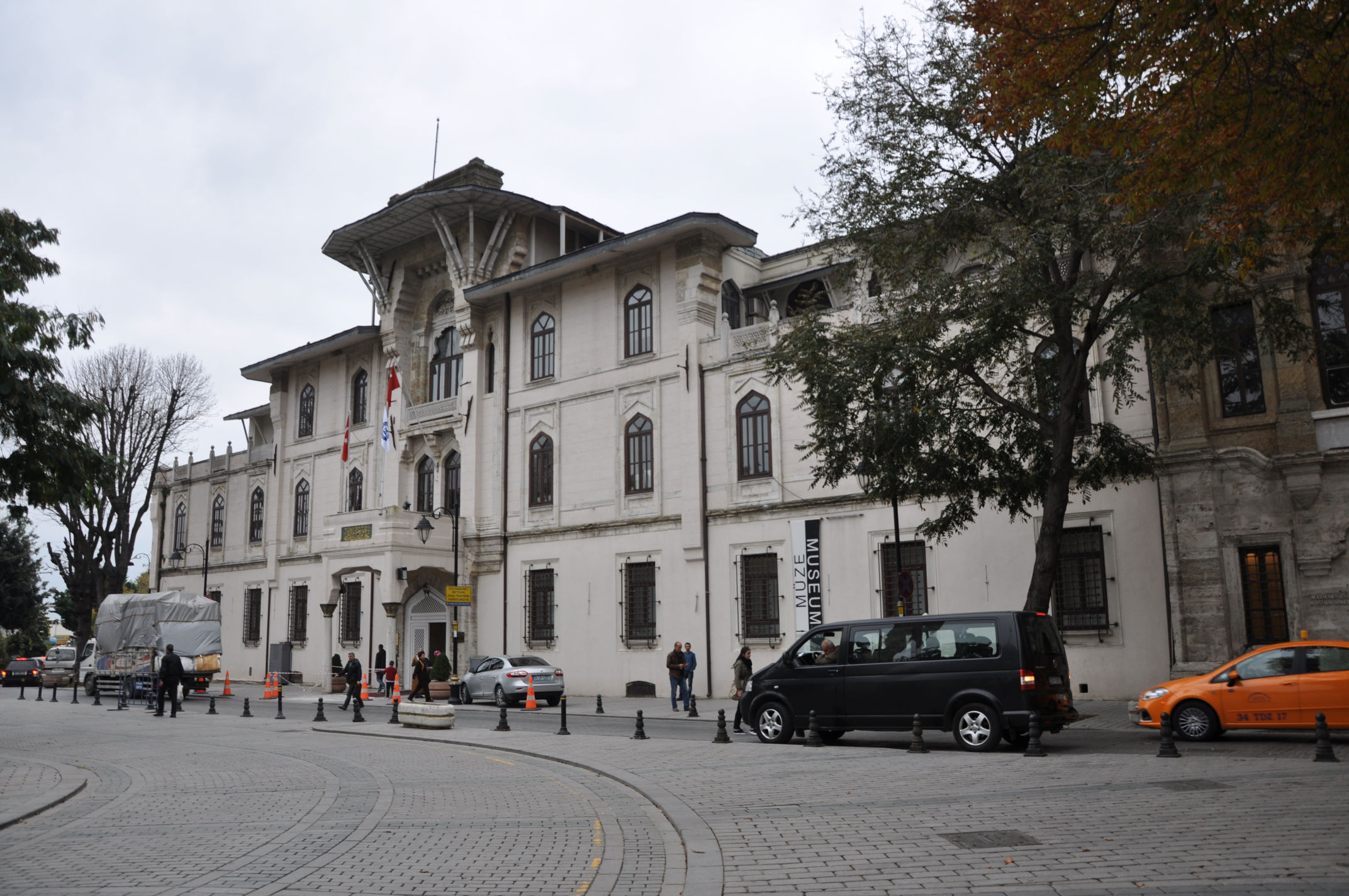
The present-day rectorate building of Marmara University is built over the site of Sultan Ahmed I's former darüşşifa and incorporates its surviving imaret buildings.

Four other structures of the complex were built over the sphendone, the semi-circular southwest end of the Hippodrome. The largest and furthest building was a hospital (darüşşifa), a square building arranged around an internal courtyard. Its construction was begun in 1609 and completed in 1620. It included a hammam (bathhouse) and a small mosque.

Directly northeast of this were three other buildings placed in a row, which together formed the imaret (a soup kitchen). This set of buildings was begun in 1617 and probably finished in 1620. The three structures include a pantry, a kitchen and oven, and a dining hall. The kitchen building is a square structure with four domes and several chimneys, while the other two structures (the pantry and dining hall) are rectangular buildings with six domes. Additionally, there were guesthouses nearby but these have disappeared.

In the 19th century, the hospital and the guesthouses were destroyed and an academy was built over the site. Only the hospital's hammam section and the marble fountain of its courtyard have survived to the present day. The academy building burned down in the 1970s but was subsequently restored and now serves as the office of the rectorate of Marmara University. The surviving buildings of the imaret have been integrated into it.

=== Other structures ===
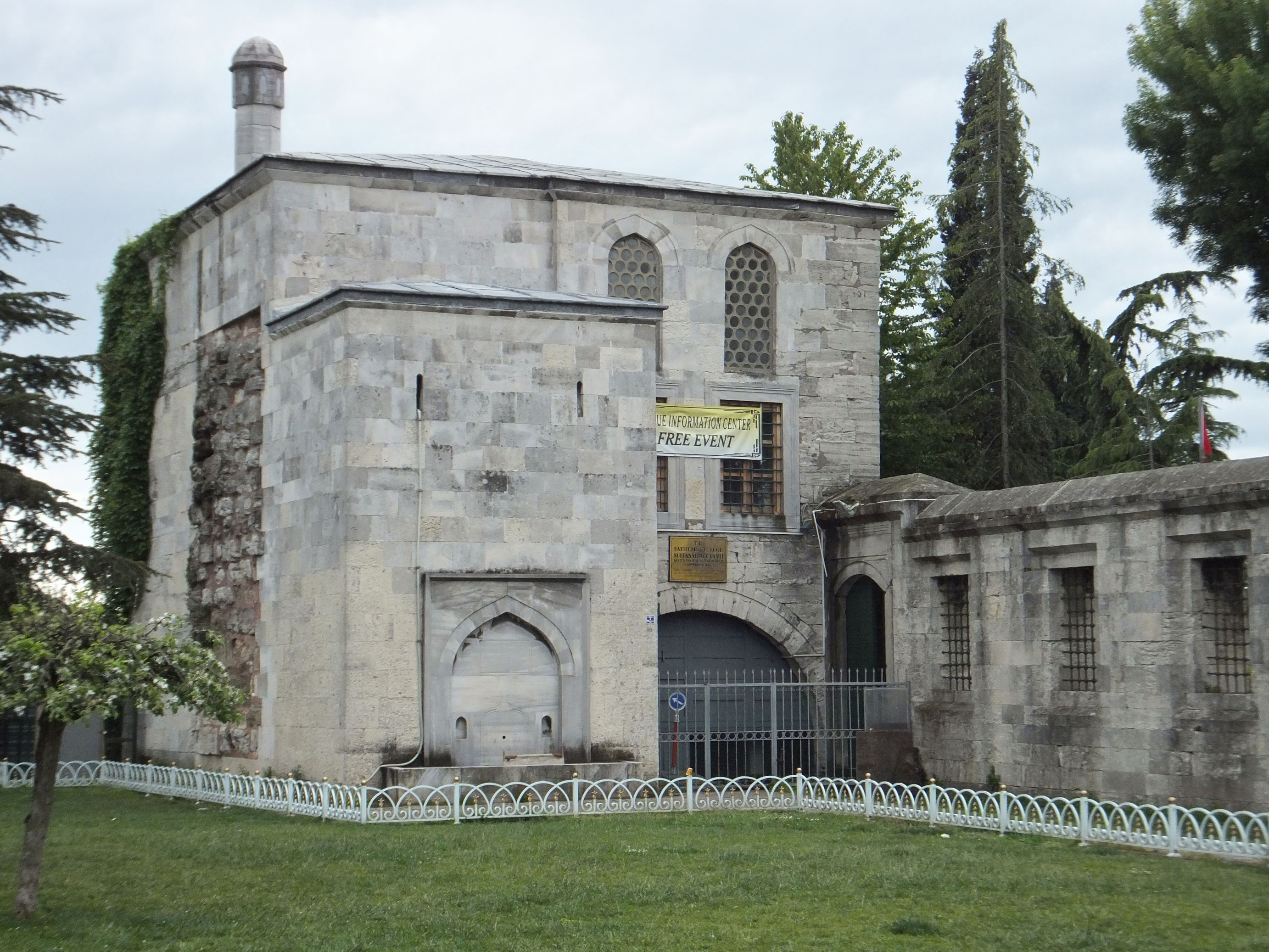
The primary school on the east side of the complex

The primary school (sibyan mektebi) is a small and simple rectangular structure built over the outer precinct wall on the east side of the mosque. It was completed around 1617 and destroyed by a fire in 1912. It has since been restored.

To the south, beyond a sloped tunnel that gives access to and from the mosque precinct, was a hammam. It was probably completed in 1617. It is now partly ruined. Its furnace room, warm room, and hot room are still mostly standing, but the front part of the building, which was probably made of wood, has been lost.

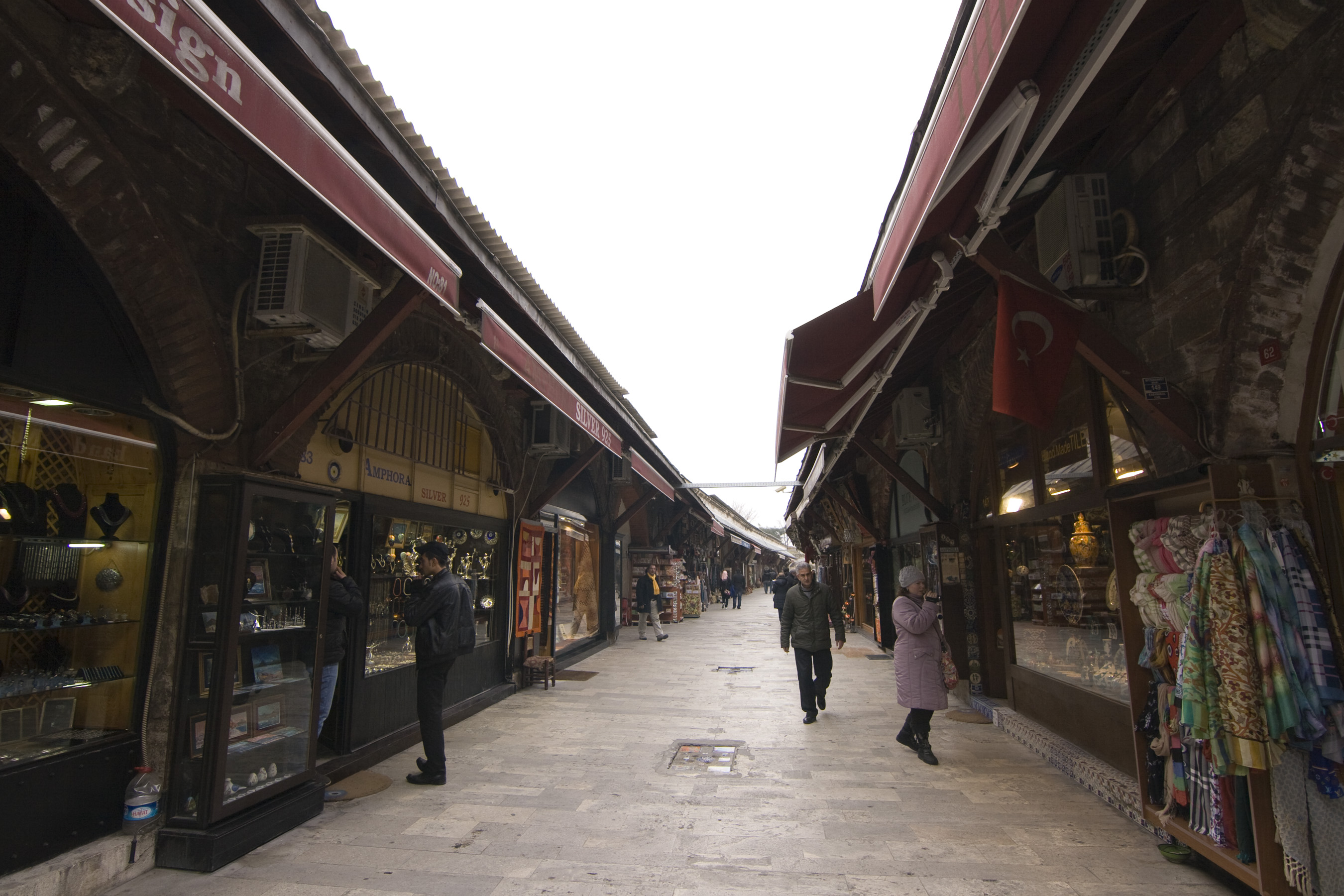
The arasta (market street or bazaar) of the Sultan Ahmed I complex, to the southeast of the mosque

Stretching below the southeast side of the mosque precinct is an arasta, a market street that was built as part of the complex. It contains spaces for around 200 shops. It too was completed in 1617. In 1912, it was destroyed by fire but it was restored from its ruined state between 1982 and 1985. It is now open as a bazaar, catering especially to tourists.

== See also ==
- List of mosques in Istanbul
- Çamlıca Mosque
- Shah Mosque
- List of tallest domes
- List of tallest structures built before the 20th century
