= Maqsurah =

Private enclosure in a mosque

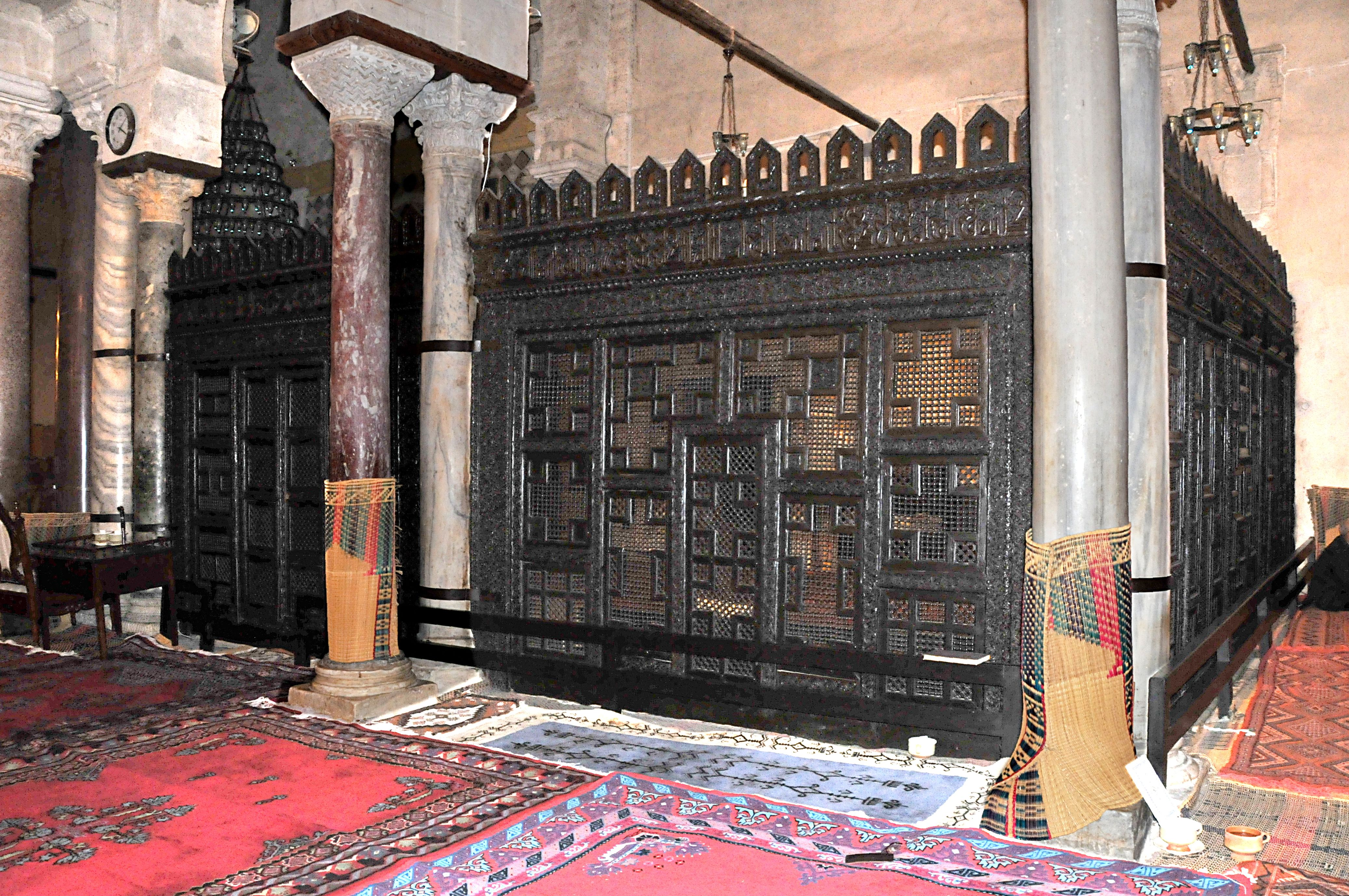
The wooden maqsura in the Great Mosque of Kairouan (Tunisia)

Maqsurah (Arabic: مقصورة, literally "closed-off space") is an enclosure, box, or wooden screen near the mihrab or the center of the qibla wall in a mosque. It was typically reserved for a Muslim ruler and his entourage, and was originally designed to shield him from potential assassins during prayer. The imam officiating inside the maqsurah typically belonged to the same school of law to which the ruler belonged.

There also may have been some spiritual connotation similar to the chancel screen in Christian churches. They were often wooden screens decorated with carvings or interlocking turned pieces of wood (similar to a mashrabiya). Sometimes, Muslim saints are buried behind a maqsurah in a similar way to a zarih.

== History ==
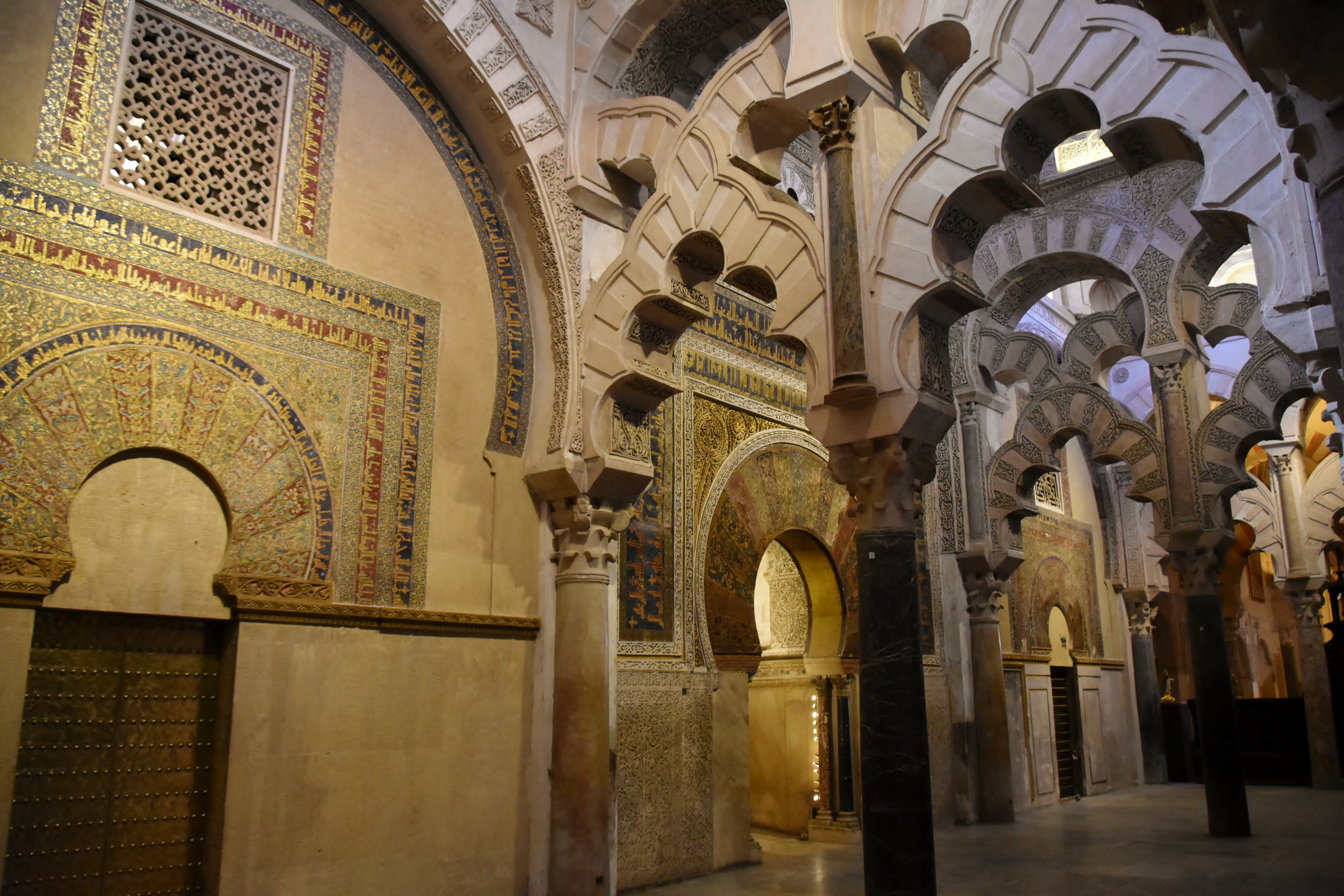
The maqsura area of the Great Mosque of Cordoba

The first maqsura is believed to have been created by Caliph Uthman (caliph between 644 and 656 CE) at the Mosque of Medina to protect himself from possible assassins after his predecessor, Umar, was assassinated inside the mosque. In this early Islamic period, the caliph also acted as imam and led prayers in the main mosque. Uthman's initial maqsura was a simple mudbrick wall pierced with holes so that he could not be approached but could still be seen by worshippers during prayers. It was later replaced by a more permanent stone structure. A maqsura was also created by the first Umayyad caliph Muawiyah I in the Umayyad Mosque of Damascus, where the so-called "Mihrab of the Companions (of the Prophet)" belonged to the "Maqsura of the Companions". Other maqsuras were also built in the same mosque at later points.

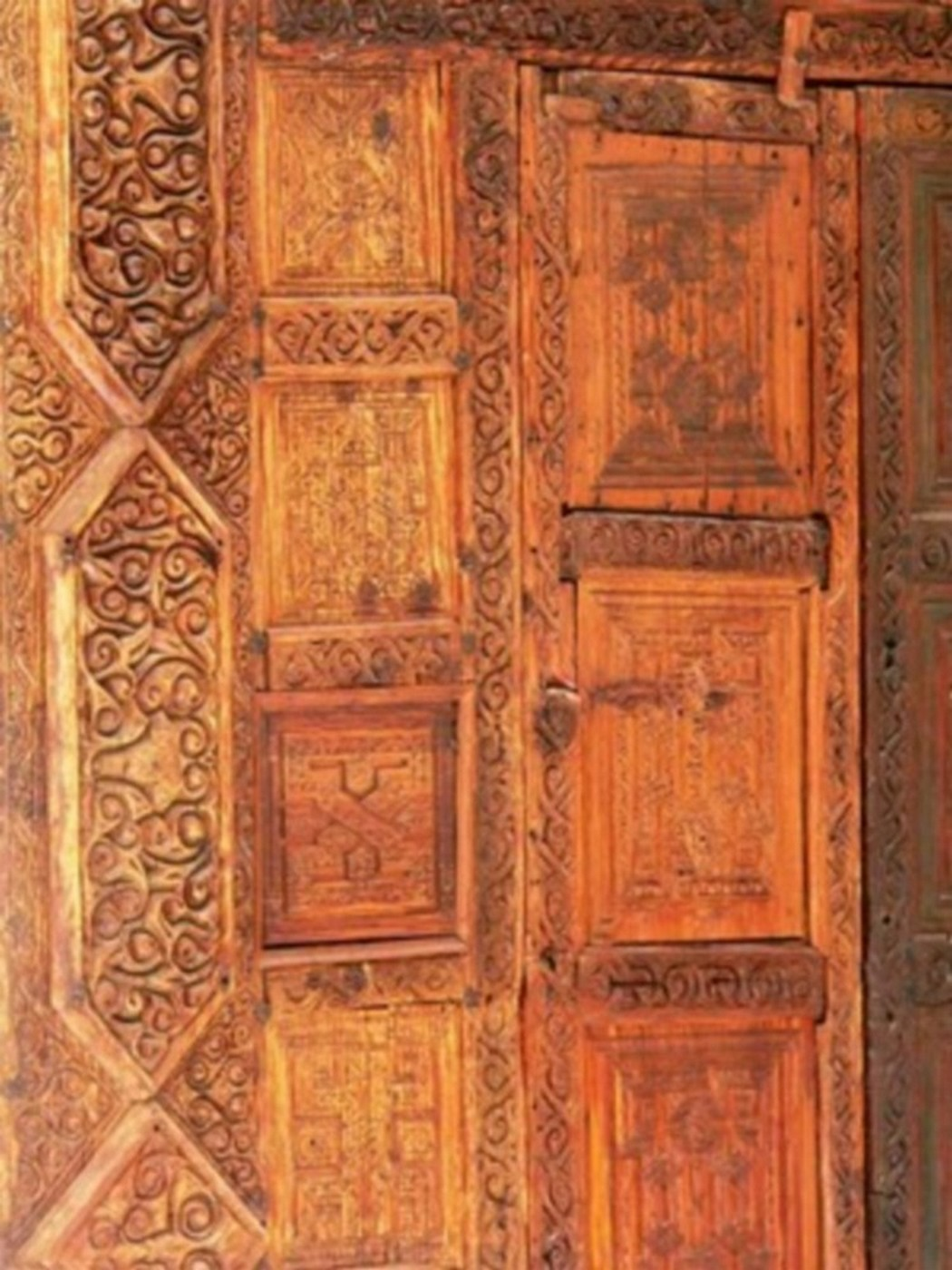
Wooden door from the ante-chamber of the Zirid maqsura of the Great Mosque of Kairouan (11th century), the oldest preserved maqsura in situ in the Islamic world, today kept in the Raqqada National Museum, Tunisia.

The oldest maqsura in the Islamic world to be preserved in situ is the wooden maqsura of the Great Mosque of Kairouan, commissioned by the Zirid ruler al-Mu῾izz ibn Badis and dating from the first half of the 11th century (though later restored in the 17th century). It is located directly to the right of the mosque's minbar, and is notable for its woodwork which includes an elaborately carved Kufic inscription dedicated to al-Mu'izz. The preserved maqsura of the Great Mosque of Cordoba, although no longer part of a functioning mosque, is even older but represents a very different example. It dates from 965 during Caliph al-Hakam II's expansion of the mosque. Rather than being situated to the side of the mihrab, the maqsura here occupied a rectangular area directly in front of and around the mihrab. Although no physical screen (if there was one) has survived, the area is marked off by the architecture of the arches around it, which differ from the rest of the mosque's arches and present an elaborate interlacing pattern which was highly influential in subsequent Moorish and Moroccan architecture. The area is also covered by three richly crafted domes above.

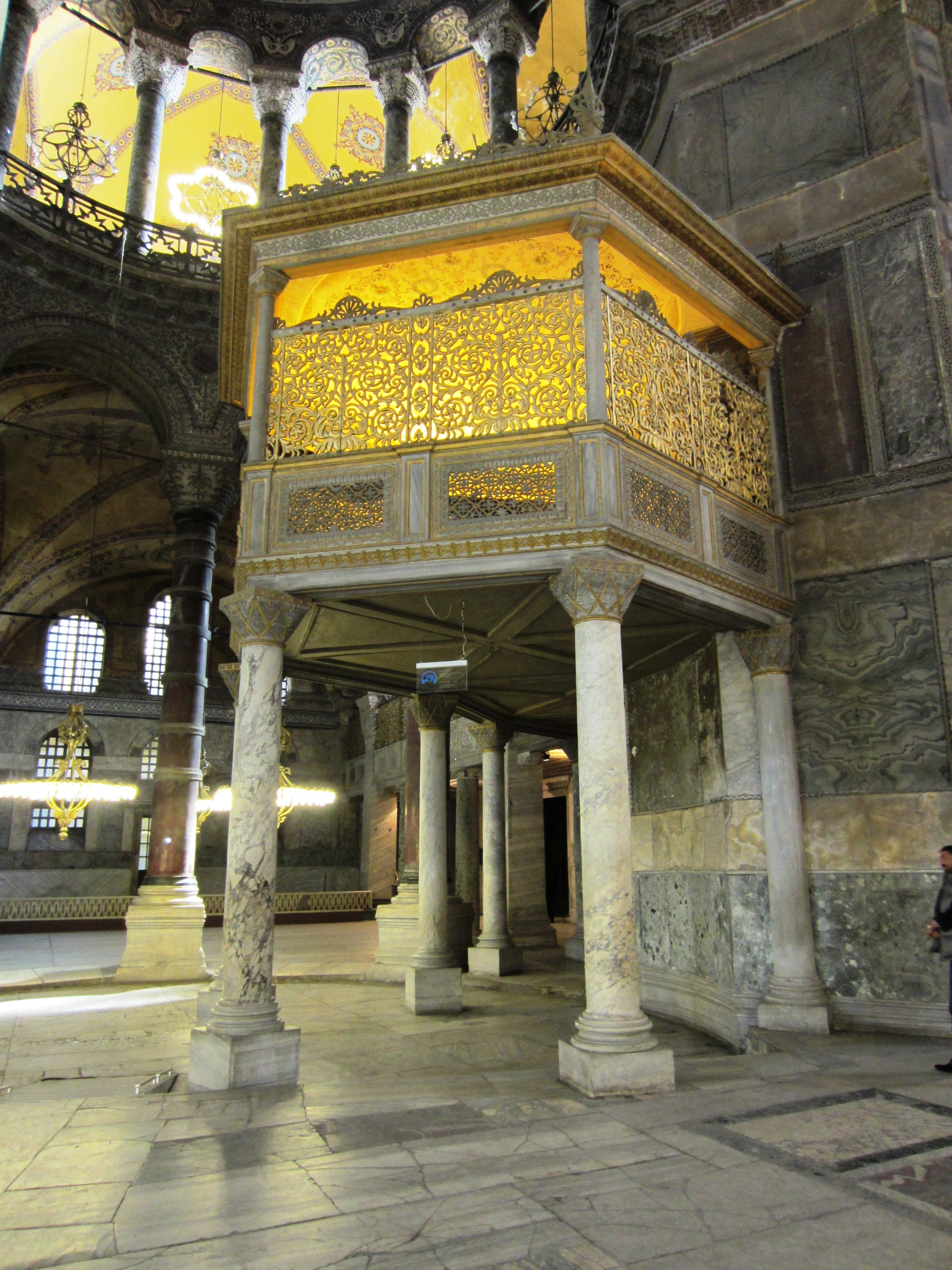
The hünkâr mahfili in the Hagia Sophia, Istanbul

Maqsuras continued to be built for some mosques throughout the Islamic world afterward, though the term also came to denote other kinds of rooms or spaces which do not appear to have been necessarily reserved for the ruler. No clear early examples of maqsuras survive in Iran, but the earliest preserved example appears to be a richly decorated balcony in the 10th-century Great Mosque of Na'in. The term maqsura is later applied to the domed space in the front of the mihrab in the Great Mosque of Qazvin and maybe also in the Great Mosque of Isfahan (to which Nizam al-Mulk added a large dome in the late 11th century). However, the term here may have had a symbolic architectural meaning rather than a functional meaning, since domes soon became typical of mosque architecture generally.

In Ottoman architecture, no areas were referred to as maqsura but most imperial mosques (commissioned by the sultan or his family) contained a Sultan's loge, known as the hünkâr mahfili, which usually consisted of an elevated platform protected by a screen. An early example of this is the richly decorated balcony in the Green Mosque (Yeşil Cami) of Bursa, dating from the early 15th century. The hünkâr mahfili then became more standard in the major mosques of Istanbul after the city's conquest. One was probably present in the original Fatih Mosque built by Mehmed II the Conqueror (which was destroyed by a later earthquake and rebuilt).
