= Hünkâr Mahfili =

Prayer platform for the Ottoman royal family

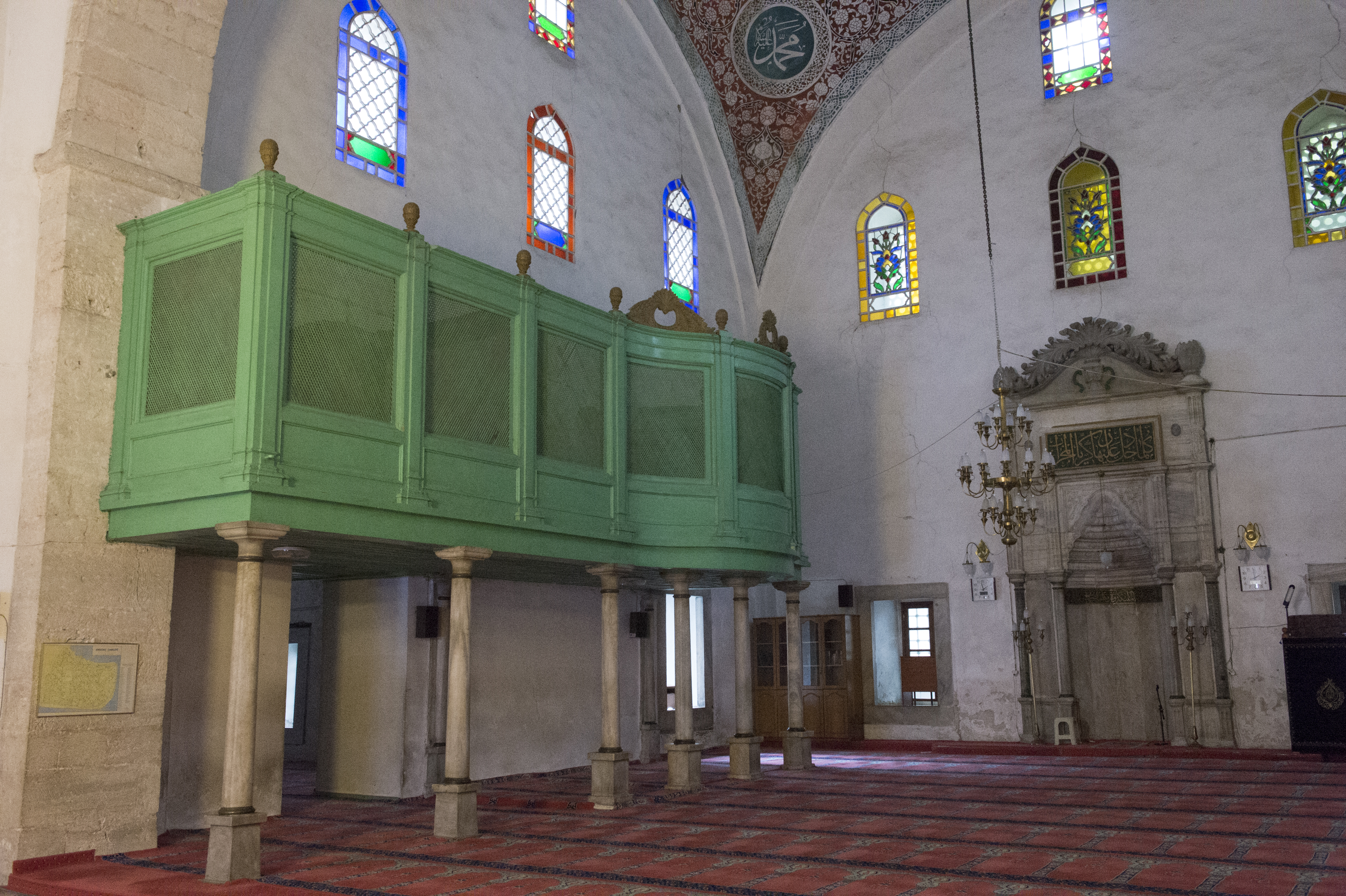
The hünkâr hahfili (green balcony on the left) in the Mahmut Pasha Mosque, located near the mihrab (decorated niche on the right)

A hünkâr mahfili, also known as a sultan's loge or imperial loge, is a structure within the prayer hall of a mosque used by the sultan, the royal family, and high-ranking government officials for performing prayer. It often takes the form of a raised loge or balcony and provides privacy and protection from would-be assassins. This feature was characteristic of Ottoman or Turkish mosques, whereas in other mosques a similar function could be served by a maqsura (a restricted area near the mihrab of the prayer hall).

The earliest clear example of an Ottoman hünkâr mahfili is that of the Green Mosque in Bursa, from the early 15th century, which consists of a richly-decorated room located above the entrance, directly opposite the prayer hall's mihrab, with an opening allowing the sultan a view onto the hall below. After the conquest of Constantinople (1453), subsequent imperial mosques usually had a sultan's loge in the form of a platform raised on columns in the southeast corner of the prayer hall (not far from the mihrab), with a screen obscuring view of the sultan from below. In later Ottoman mosques, the loge was often connected to a hünkâr kasrı, a private lounge or pavilion for royal use, which was accessed via an external ramp and provided direct entry to the hünkâr mahfili, bypassing the public areas of the mosque.

== Etymology ==
The term hünkâr is a title derived from Ottoman Turkish and Persian, meaning "sovereign", "monarch", or "ruler".

Etymologically, it is a contracted borrowing from the Persian خوندگار (xwand-gār or xondgâr), which evolved from the Classical Persian title خداوندگار (xudāvand-gār or xodāvandegār), denoting an "emperor", "lord", or "supreme ruler". This in turn stems from Middle Persian xwadāwand ("master" or "lord"), derived from Middle Persian xwadāy ("ruler", "king").

In Sasanian political culture, xudāvandīgār was an honorific title applied to sovereigns. The abbreviated forms xwand-gār or xunkār (خونکار) were subsequently adopted and used prominently by Turkic rulers operating within the Persianate political tradition, eventually becoming a standard imperial title for Ottoman sultans. Folk etymologies that occasionally link the term to the Persian خونکار (xūn-kār, literally "bloodshedder") are considered historically and linguistically inaccurate in the context of political titles.

The word mahfil (محفل) comes from the Arabic root ḥ-f-l (حفل), meaning to gather or assemble, denoting a place of assembly or gathering.

== Gallery ==
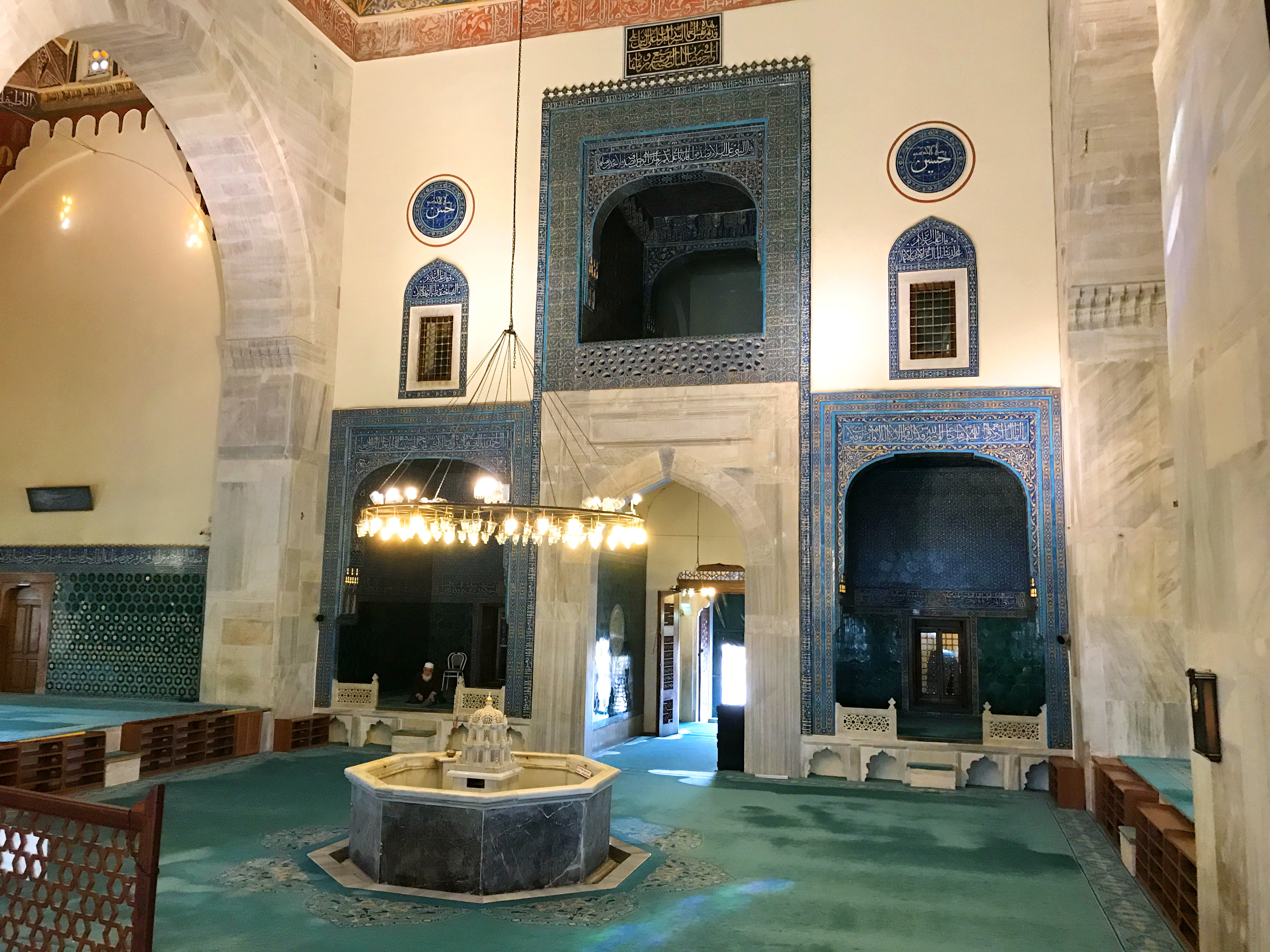
The hünkâr mahfili in the early 15th-century Green Mosque of Bursa is a room above the entrance (upper middle in the picture here)

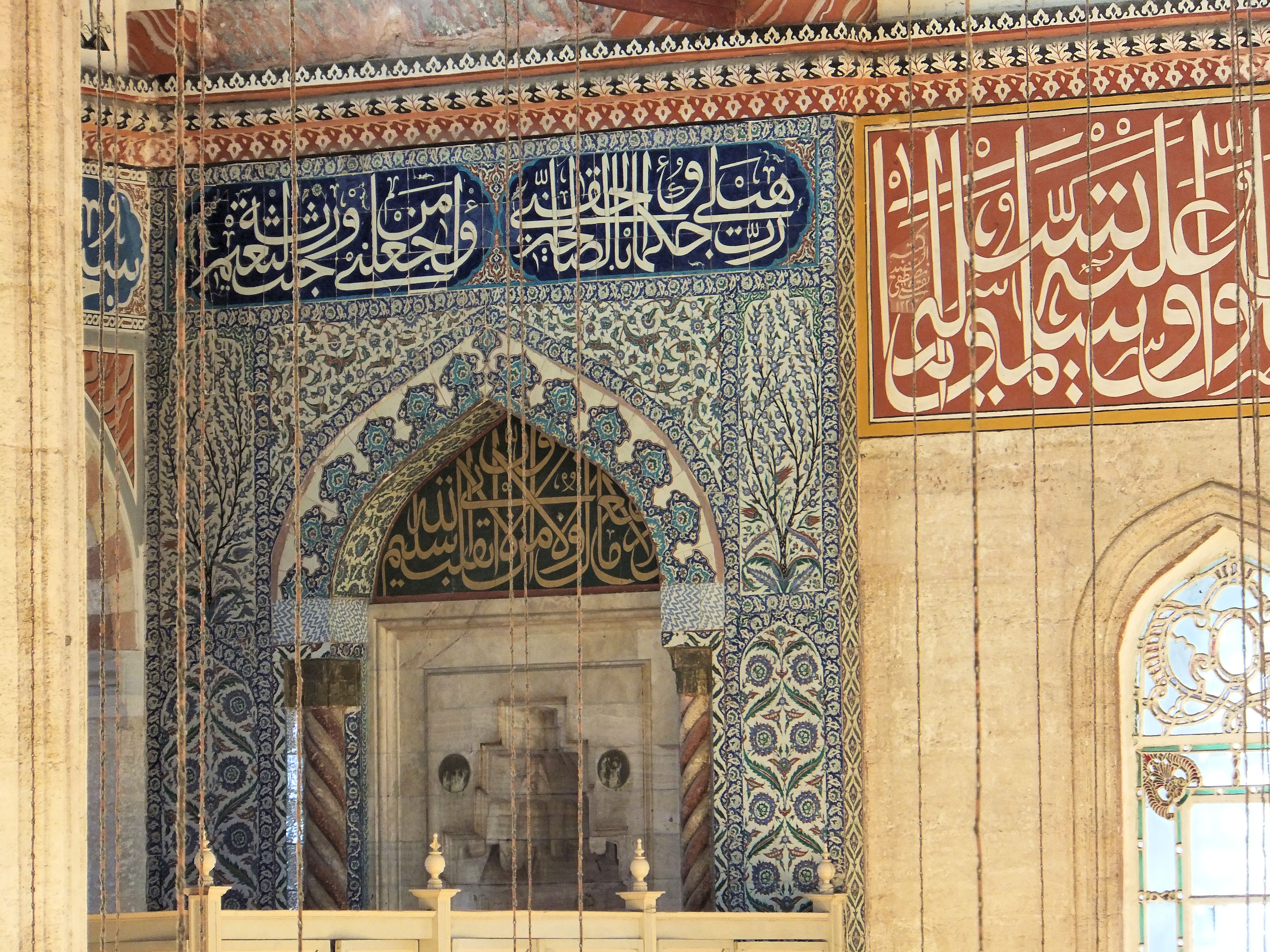
Partial view of the hünkâr mahfili in the late 16th-century Selimiye Mosque in Edirne, with its own private mihrab visible

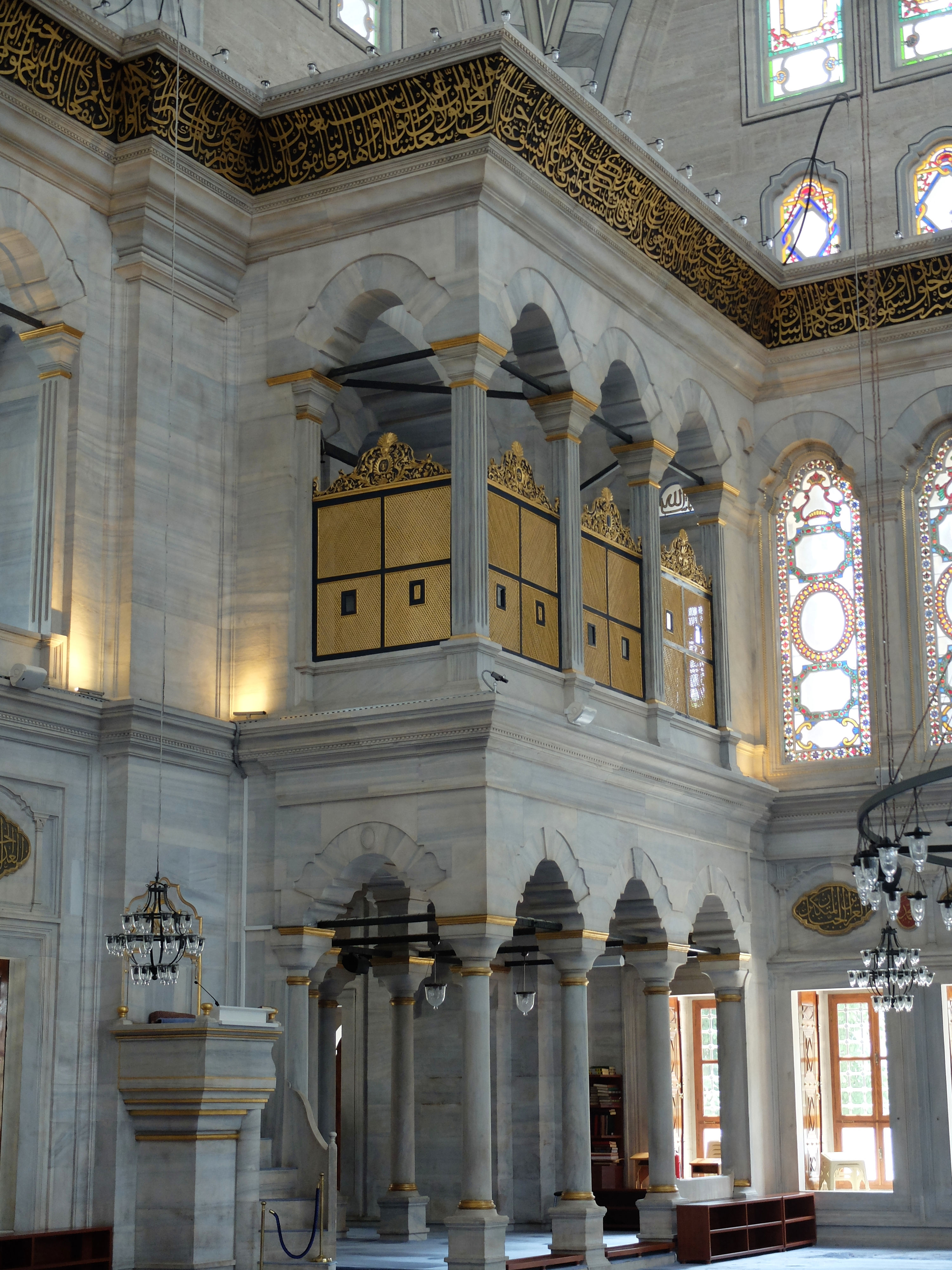
The hünkâr mahfili inside the 18th-century Nuruosmaniye Mosque in Istanbul

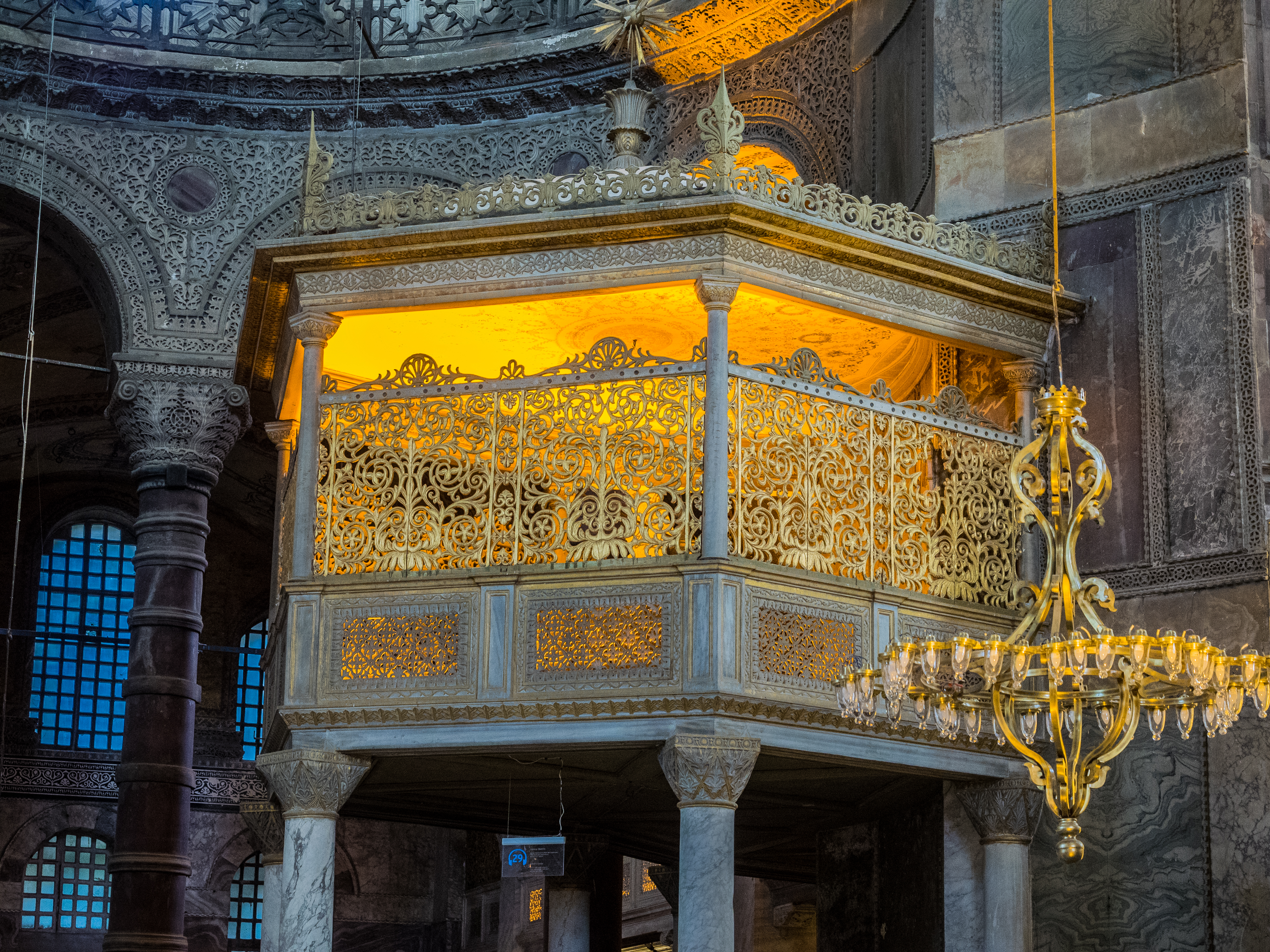
The hünkâr mahfili preserved inside the Hagia Sophia today dates from a 19th-century renovation.

== See also ==
- Maqsura
