= Taksim Mosque =

Mosque in Istanbul, Turkey

- Taksim Camii
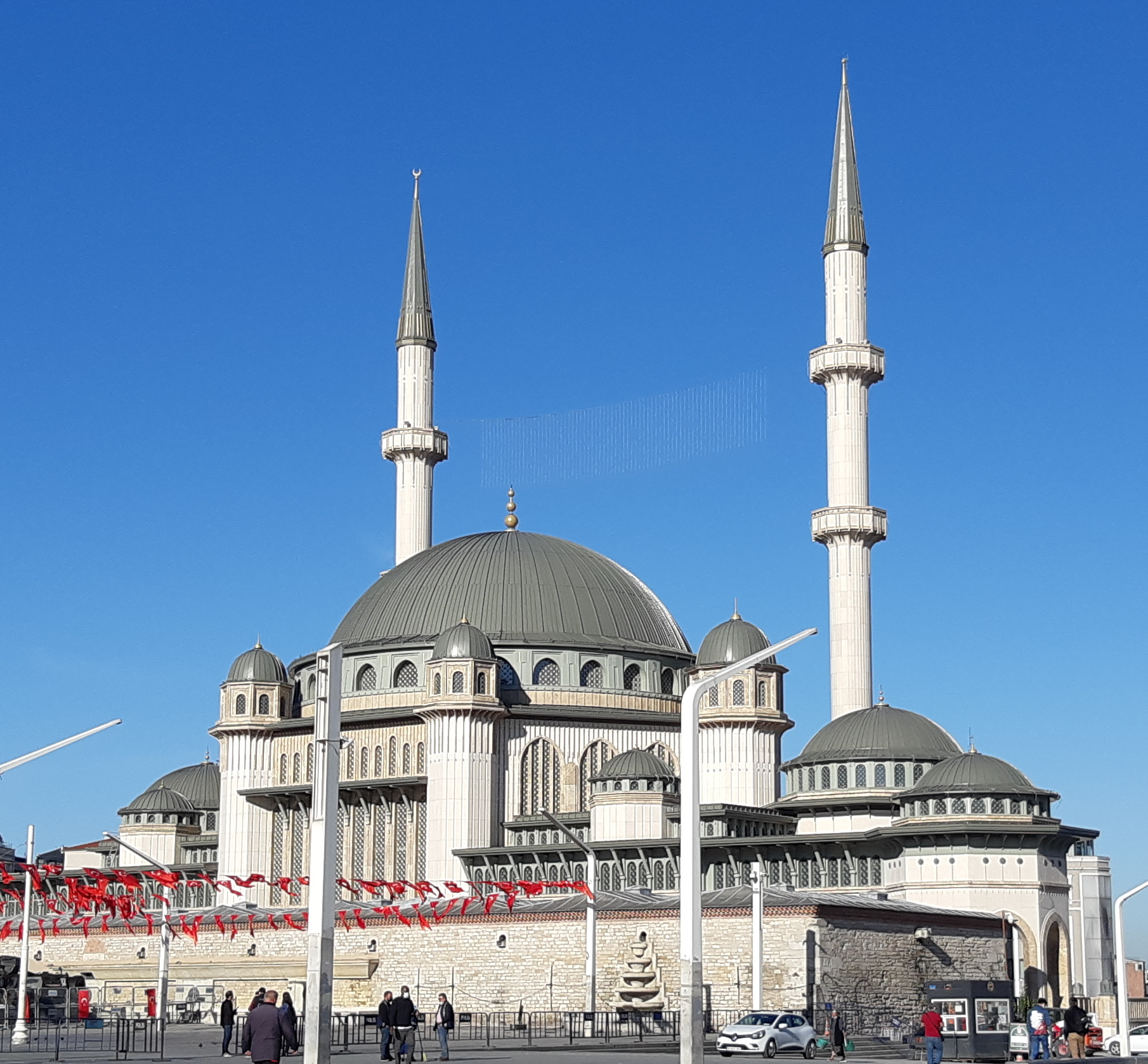
- Taksim Mosque in May 2021

- Location within Istanbul Fatih

Religion
- Affiliation: Islam

Location
- Location: Taksim Square, Beyoğlu, Istanbul
- Interactive map of Taksim Mosque
- Coordinates: 41°02′13″N 28°59′02″E

Architecture
- Architects: Şefik Birkiye, Selim Dalaman
- Style: Neo-Art Deco
- Completed: 28 May 2021; 5 years ago

Specifications
- Capacity: 3,000 people indoors, 4,000 in total
- Length: 20.70 m (67.9 ft) (building height above the ground)
- Dome height (outer): 33 m (108 ft)
- Dome height (inner): 9.6 m (31 ft)
- Dome dia. (outer): 28 m (92 ft)
- Minaret: 2
- Minaret height: 64.8 m (213 ft)

Taksim Mosque (Turkish: Taksim Camii) is a mosque complex in Taksim Square, Istanbul. It was designed by two Turkish architects in the Art Deco style, and can hold up to 3,000 worshippers at the same time. Construction began on February 17, 2017, and lasted for four years. The mosque was inaugurated with a Friday prayer attended by the President, Recep Tayyip Erdoğan, on 28 May 2021.

The land on which the mosque was built is currently owned by the Directorate General of Foundations.

== History ==
The plan for a mosque in Taksim Square has been in the making since 1952. The "Taksim Mosque Building and Sustenance Association" was founded with the aim to construct a mosque in Taksim Square, but was closed after the 1980 military coup in Turkey. The Council of State stopped the Taksim Mosque project in 1983 on the grounds that it was "not in the public interest".

The Taksim Mosque remained on the agenda of the governments of Turgut Özal in the 1980s and Necmettin Erbakan in 1996. The project has always been closely scrutinized by the media and has encountered legal obstacles because Taksim Square had been closely associated with republicanism and secularism. A court objected to the construction of the mosque on the grounds that it would be against the public interest. President Recep Tayyip Erdogan had supported the idea of the mosque since becoming Istanbul's mayor in 1994. The prospect of the new mosque was one element in the Gezi Park protests in 2013.

In January 2017, the mosque was approved by the Cultural Monuments Preservation Board, which oversees the construction of protected, historic sites, thereby removing the last obstacle to its construction.

=== Construction process ===
Following approval for the construction of the mosque by the Istanbul #2 Regional Council for the Protection of Cultural Heritage on January 19, 2017, it was announced that some small offices and facilities would be demolished. Site preparations started on February 9, 2017. Ahmet Misbah Demircan, the Mayor of Beyoğlu District, named Şefik Birkiye the architect of the mosque on February 10, 2017; Sur Yapı was contracted to carry out its construction.

== Location ==
The mosque is located just behind Taksim Maksemi, the stone water storage unit and distribution source built by Sultan Mahmud I in 1731. The mosque faces the Atatürk Cultural Center across Taksim Square. The pedestrian shopping street, Istiklal Caddesi, runs off Taksim Square beside the mosque. The Hagia Triada Greek Orthodox Church is on the other side of Istiklal Street from the mosque.

== Architectural features ==
Excluding the two minarets, the mosque's height is approximately 30 m (98 ft), making it the same height as the two historical churches in the vicinity. The mosque has been designed in a modern take on the traditional domed style associated with Sinan and has been cleverly tailored to fit its confined setting. The complex includes a conference and exhibition hall and an underground parking garage.

The mosque's design contains details that are not found in classical Ottoman Turkish architecture, such as the shape and proportion of the oversized balconies on the minarets. The smaller cupolas surrounding the main dome are reminiscent of Mughal architecture in terms of design.

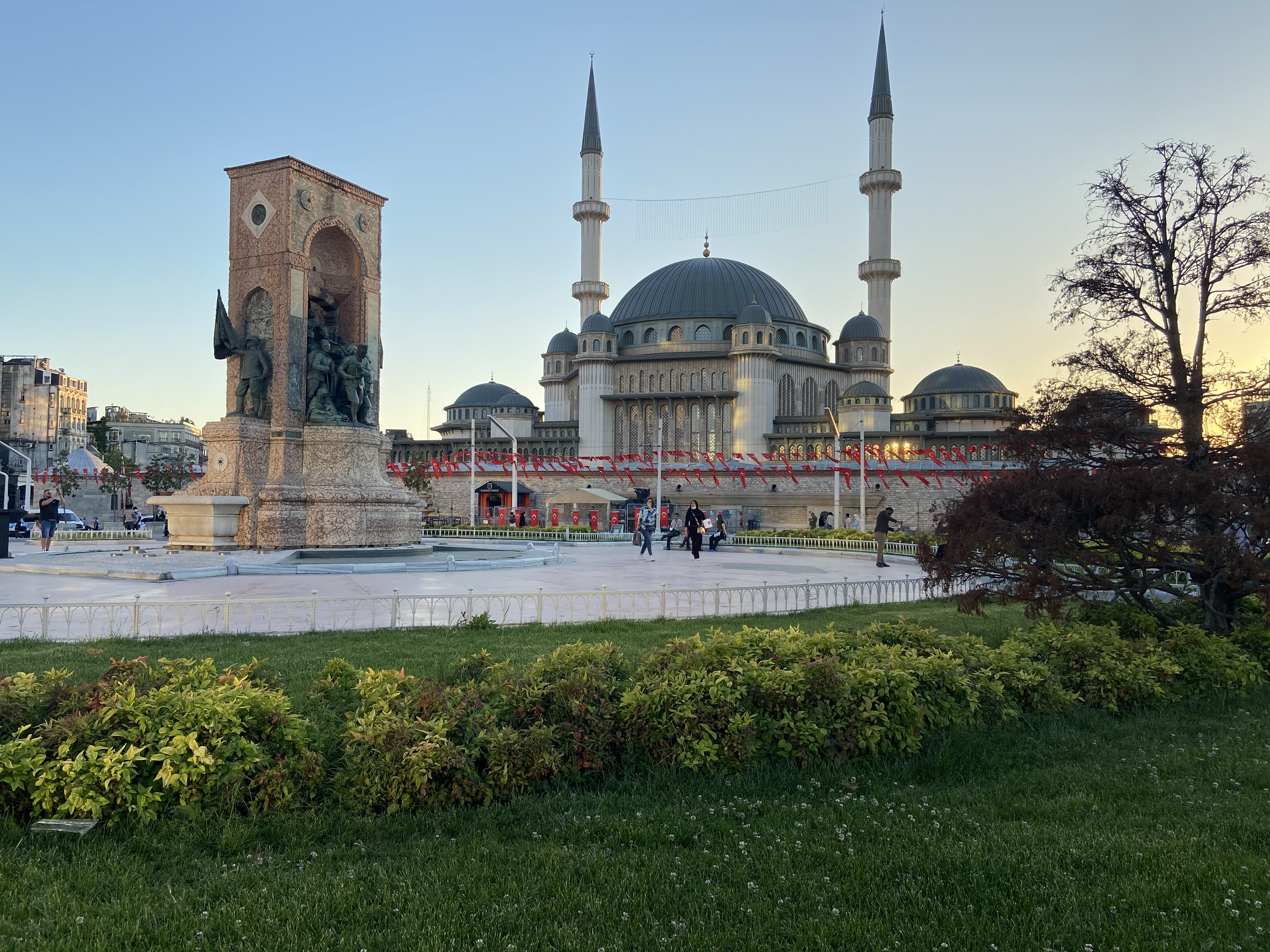
Mosque with Taksim Monument in the foreground

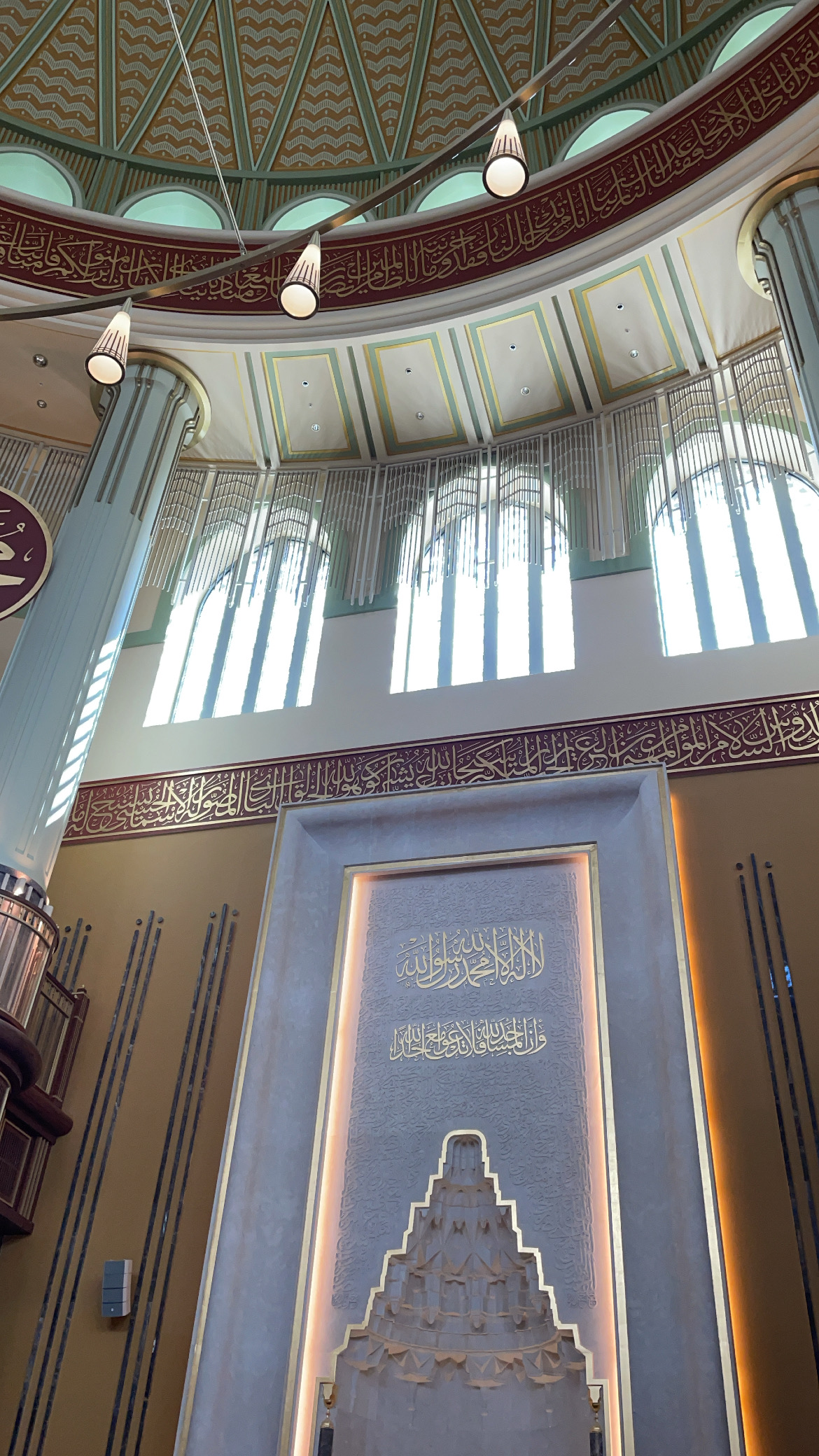
Top of the mihrab (prayer niche)

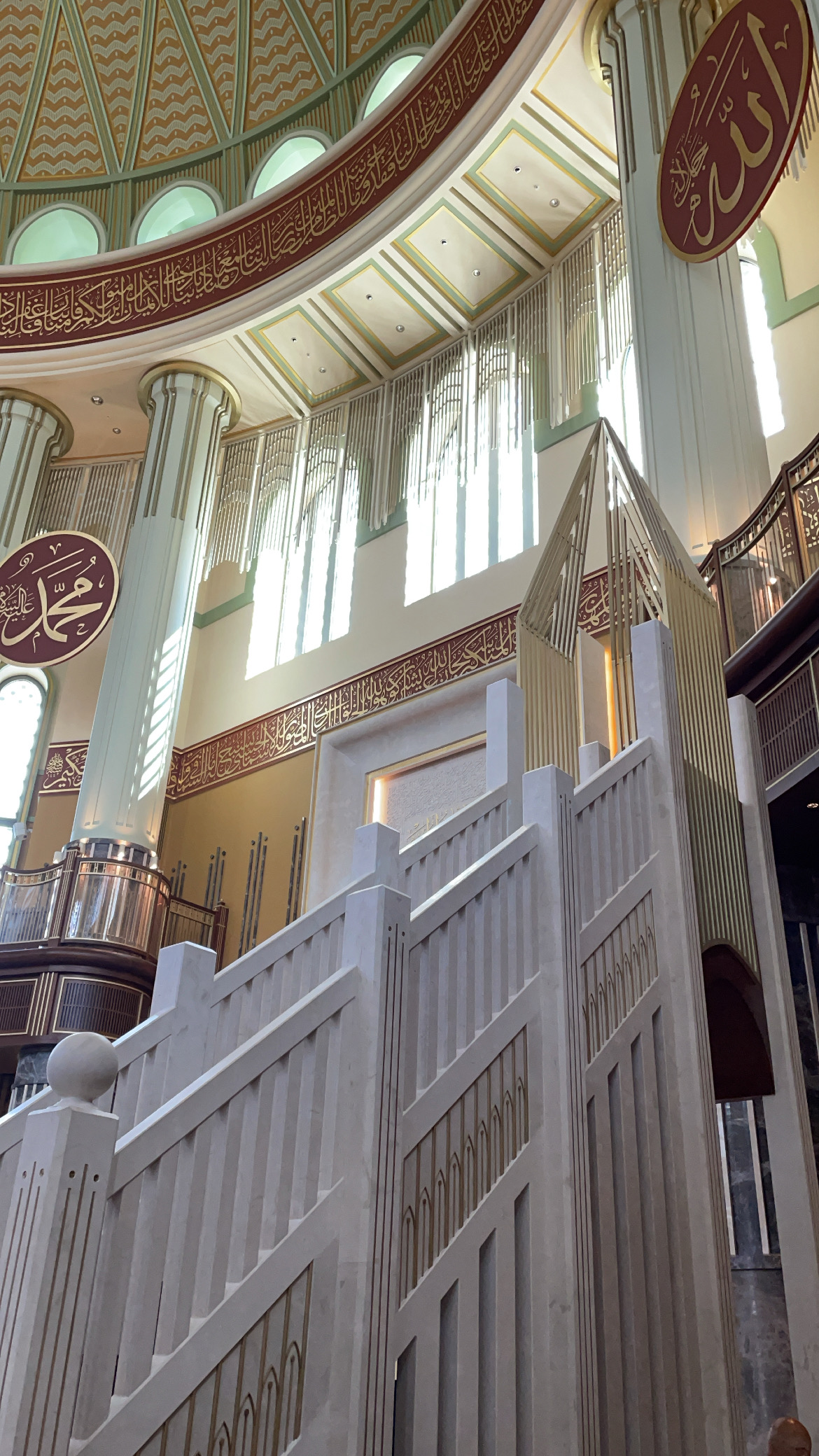
The minbar (sermon pulpit)

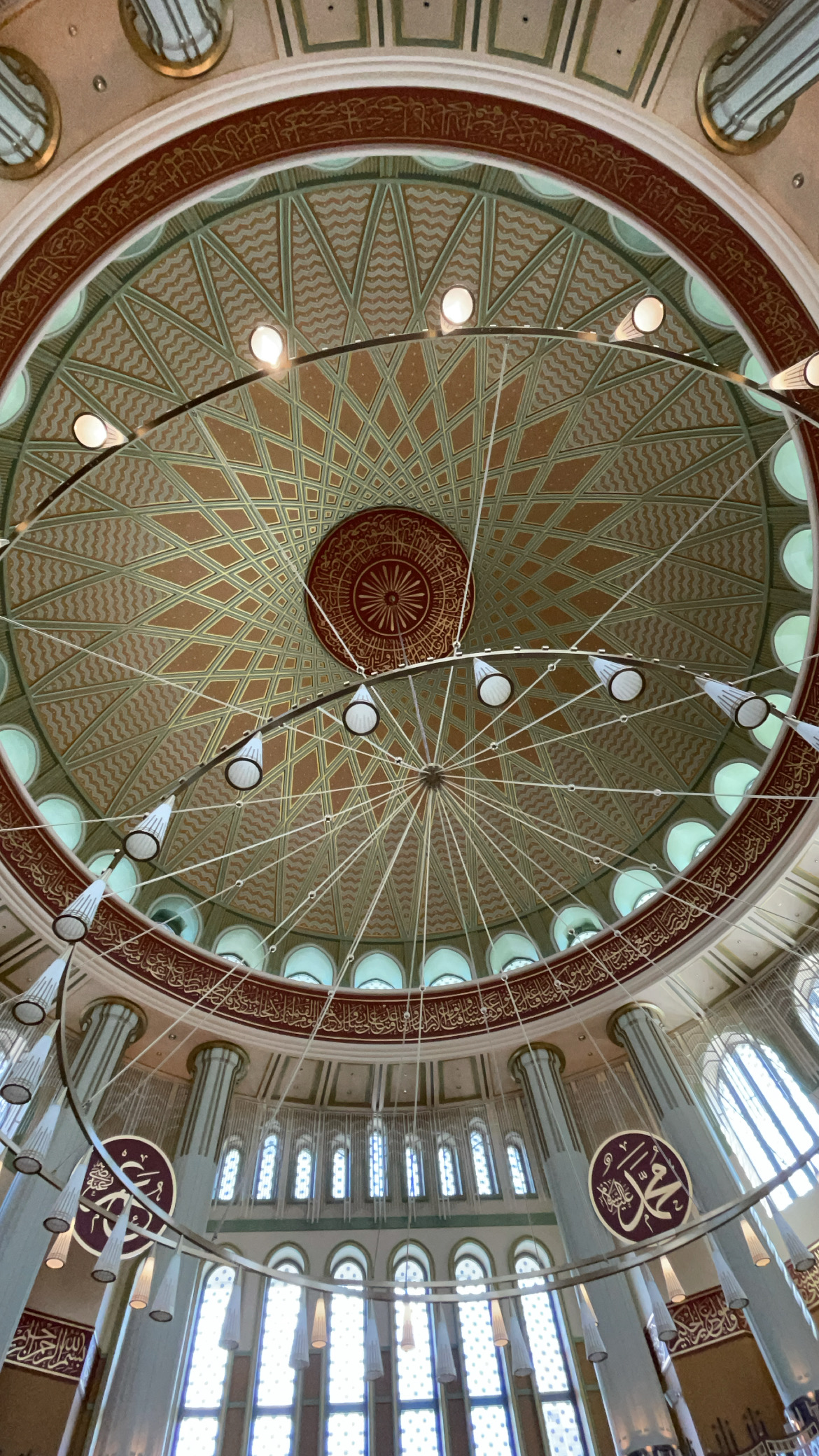
A view of the dome

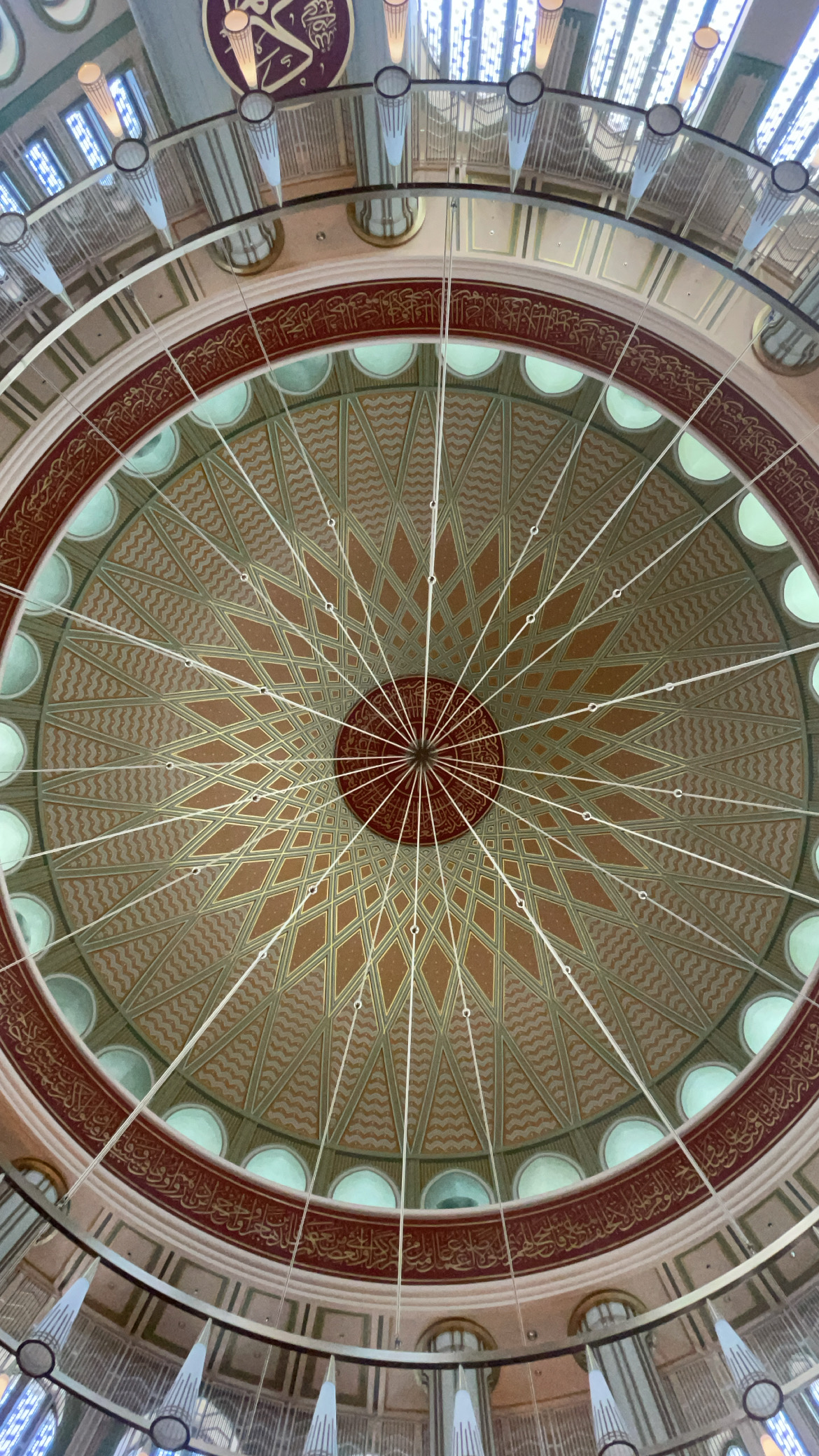
The interior of the dome

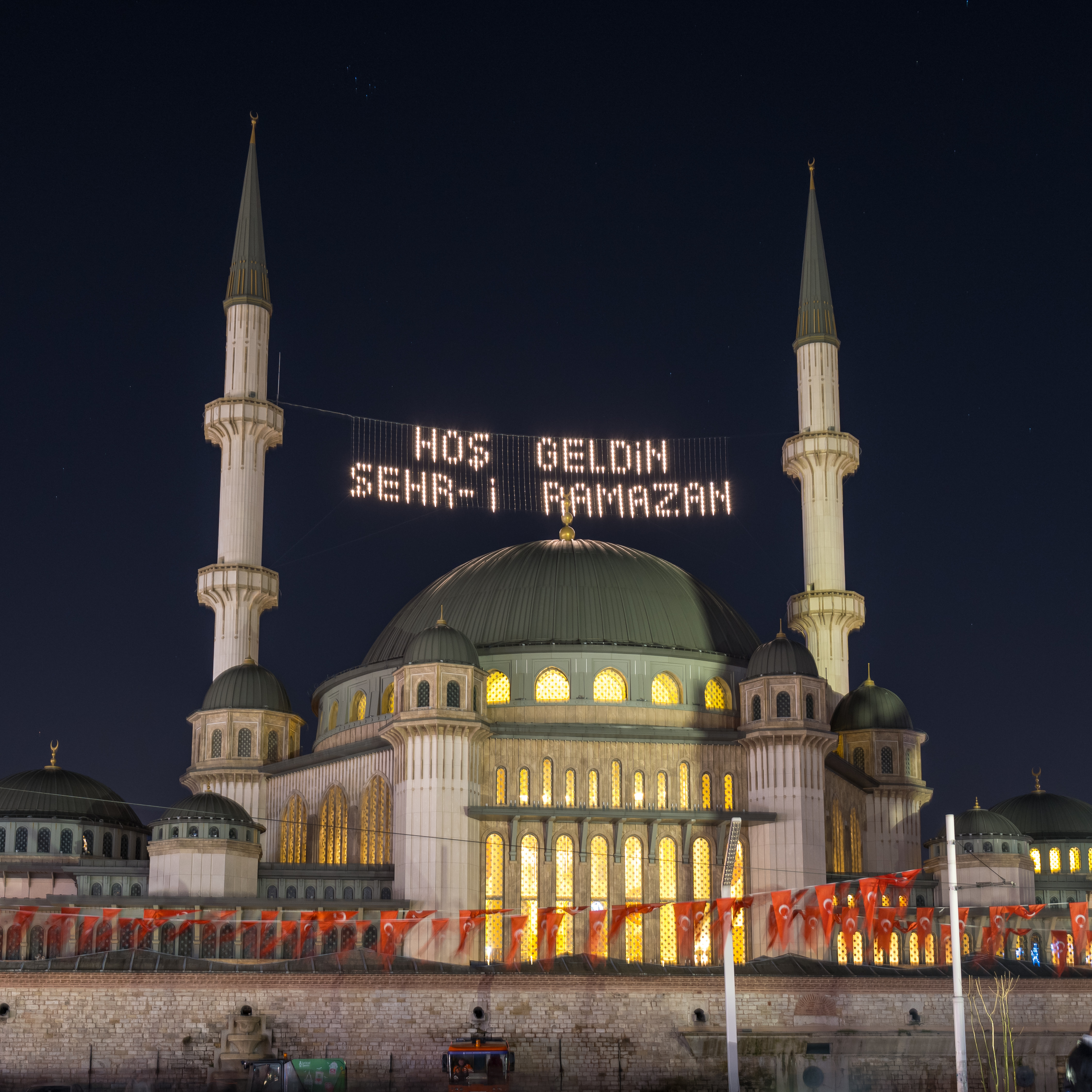
Night view of the mosque with Mahya lights welcoming the holy month of Ramadan

== See also ==
- Barbaros Hayrettin Pasha Mosque
- Çamlıca Mosque
- Hagia Triada Orthodox Church
- Catholic Church of St. Anthony of Padua
- Islam in Turkey
- List of mosques in Turkey
