= Çamlıca Mosque =

Mosque in Turkey

- Çamlıca Camii
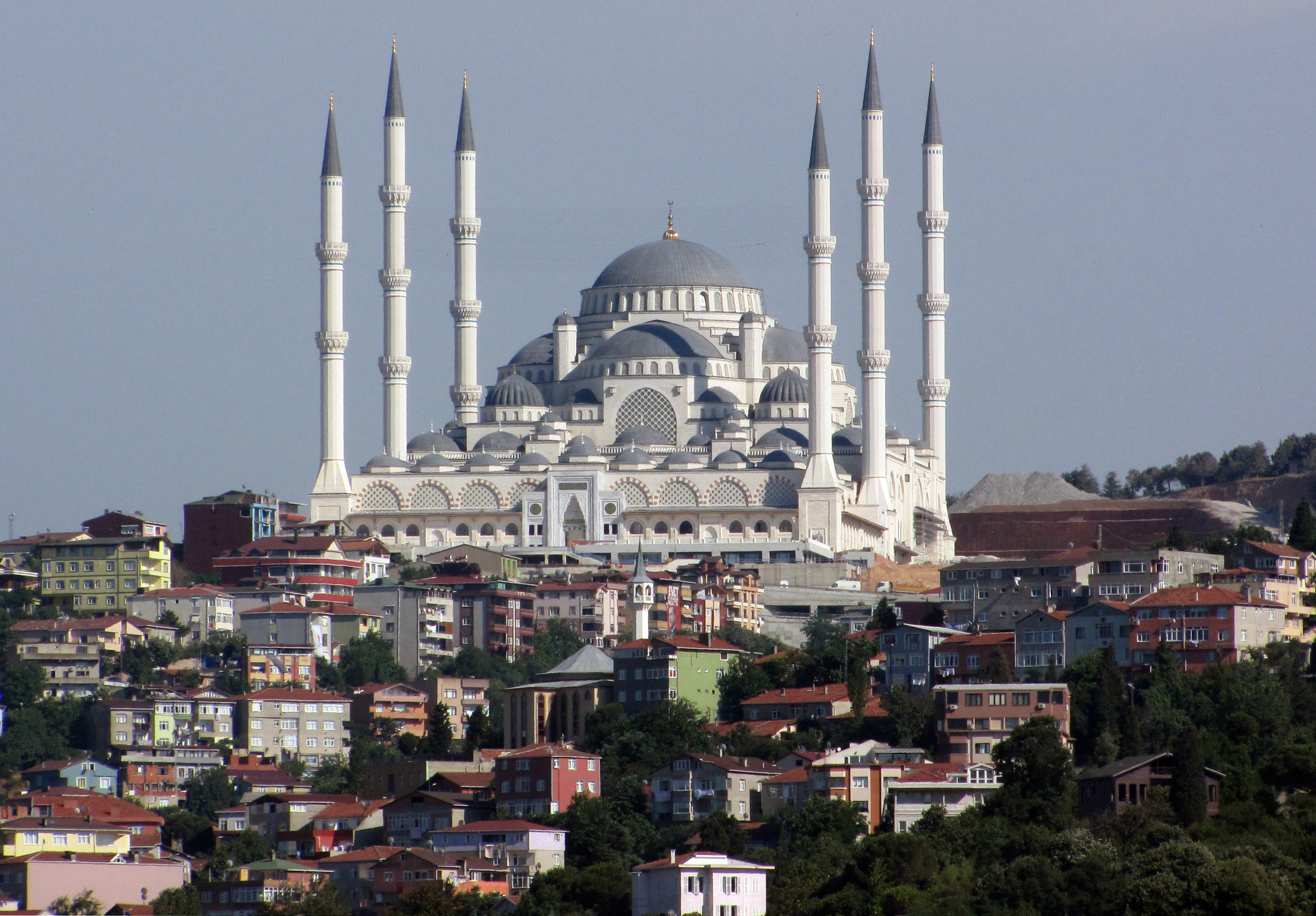

Religion
- Affiliation: Islam

Location
- Location: Istanbul, Turkey
- Interactive map of Çamlıca Mosque
- Coordinates: 41.0347°N 29.0708°E

Architecture
- Type: Mosque
- Style: Islamic, Late Classical Ottoman
- Groundbreaking: 2013
- Completed: 2019

Specifications
- Capacity: 63,000
- Dome: 70
- Dome height (outer): 72 m (236 ft)
- Minaret: 6
- Minaret height: 107.1 m (351 ft)

The Grand Çamlıca Mosque (Turkish pronunciation: [tʃamlɯdʒa], transliterated as Chamlija in English) (Turkish: Büyük Çamlıca Camii) is a landmark complex for Islamic worship which was completed and opened on 7 March 2019. The mosque stands astride Çamlıca Hill in the Üsküdar district of Istanbul and is visible from much of the centre of the city. The complex incorporates an art gallery, library, and conference hall. It can hold up to 63,000 worshippers at a time (can accommodate up to 100,000 people in case of an earthquake).

The cost of the mosque was US$110 million (approx. 550 million Turkish liras at the time). Planning for the Çamlıca Mosque began in the year 2000 and was led by two female architects, Bahar Mızrak and Hayriye Gül Totu. Their design won second prize in a competition to come up with something suitable.

The mosque was officially inaugurated on 3 May 2019 by the current President of Turkey, Recep Tayyip Erdoğan. Several international leaders were present at the ceremony including Senegalese President Macky Sall, Guinean President Alpha Conde, Albanian president Ilir Meta, Palestinian Prime Minister Mohammad Shtayyeh and other foreign dignitaries.

Çamlıca Mosque was only the third mosque in Turkey to have six minarets, after the Sultanahmet (Blue) Mosque in Istanbul and the Sabancı Merkez Mosque in Adana.

In 2022, work was under way to add a spur to the M5 Metro line from Üsküdar to include a stop at the Çamlıca Mosque.

== Architecture ==
The mosque's design was inspired by Classical Ottoman architecture and the works of Mimar Sinan.

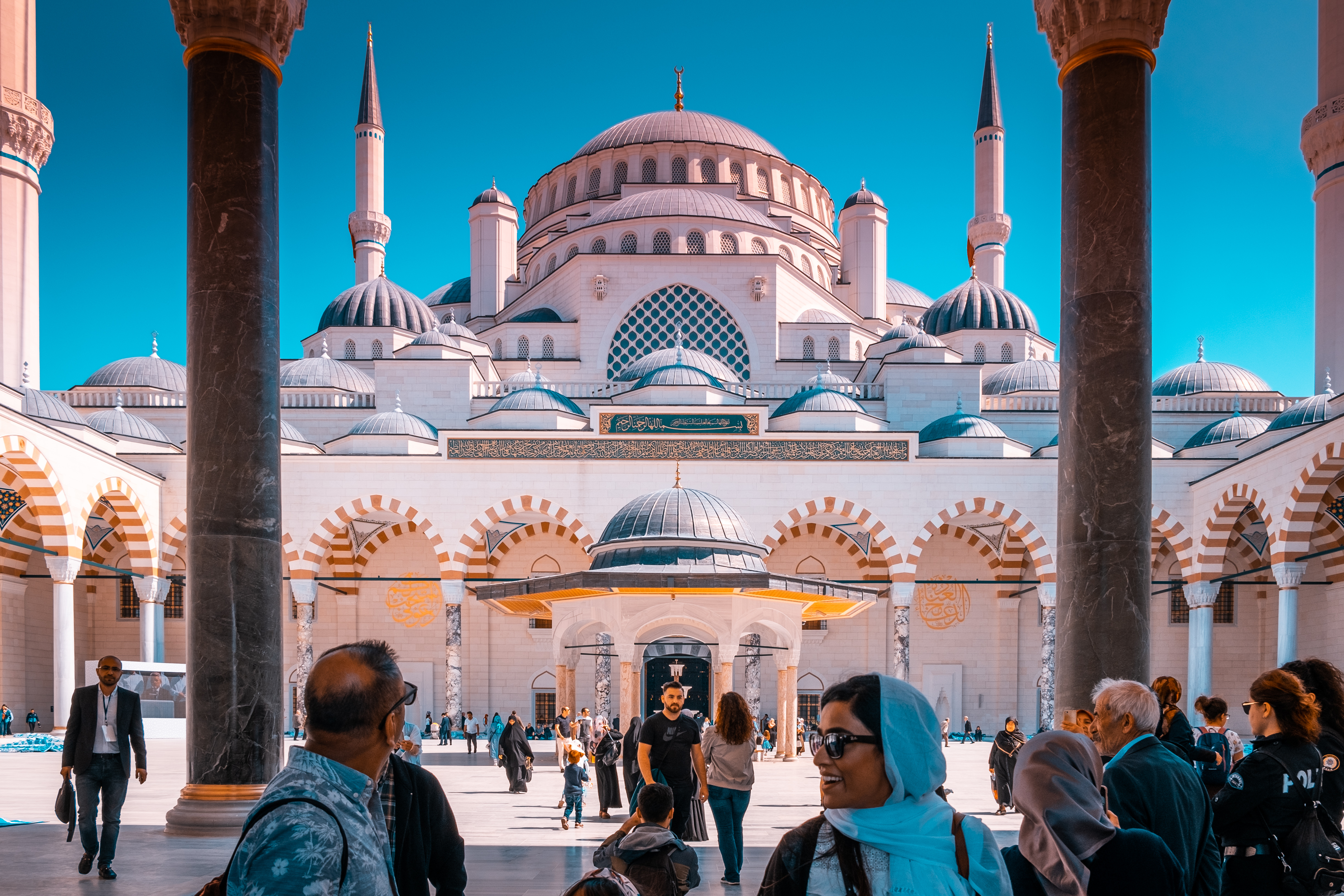
Çamlıca Mosque front view

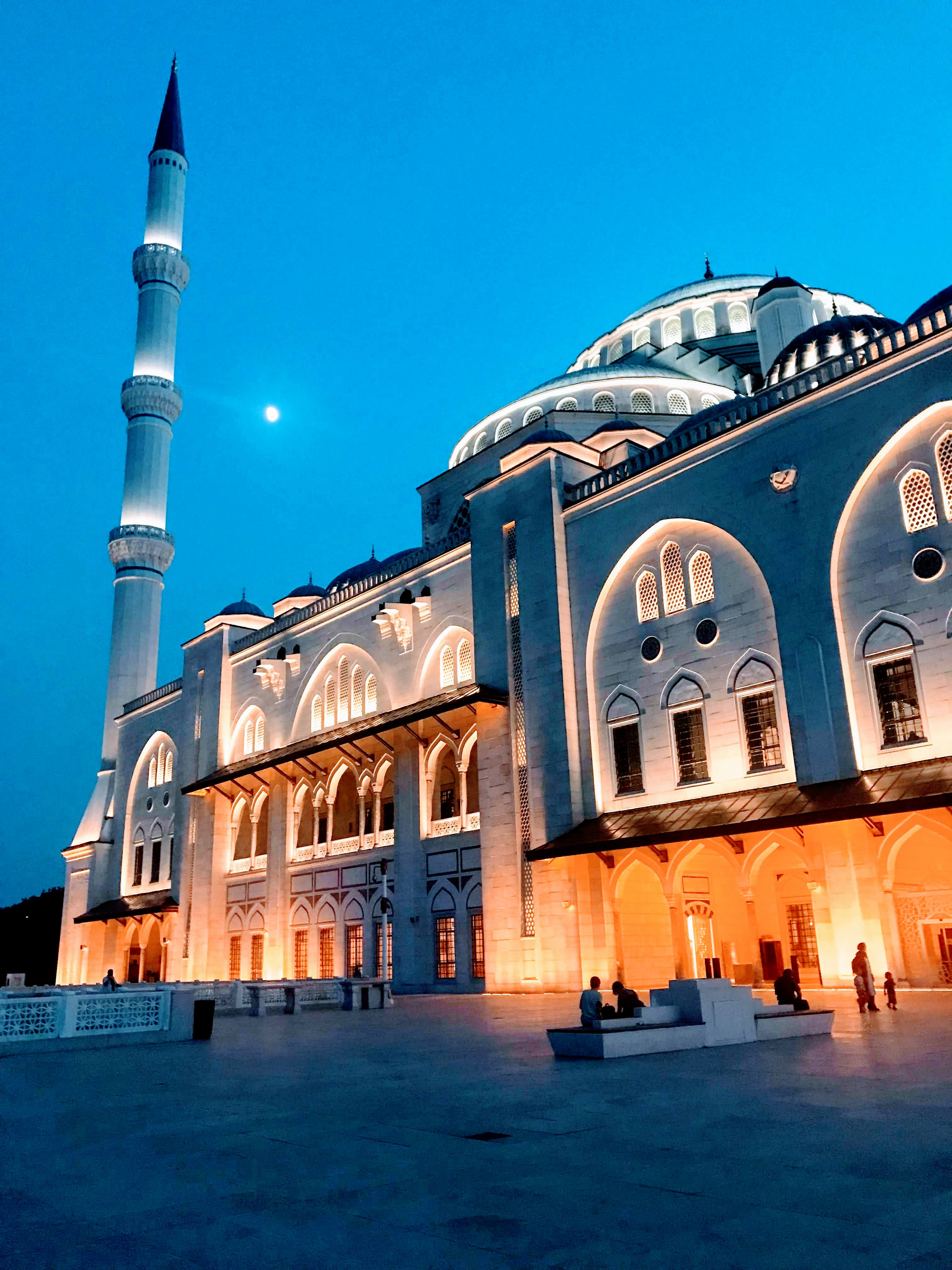
Mosque at night

The exterior of the mosque has been described as "a huge box attached to a colonnaded courtyard; on top of the box, domes and half-domes swarm around a squat central dome surmounted by a golden, crescent-shaped finial." The exterior design may be influenced by Sinan but "its use of concrete has relegated Sinan's structural devices – the dome-clusters, for example, that he used to diffuse the downward thrust of the main dome – to mere ornament." It was supposedly designed to rival Sinan's famous Suleymaniye Mosque, across the Bosphorus on the European side of Istanbul.

At 72 metres in height, the main dome of Çamlıca Mosque symbolises the 72 nations residing in Istanbul, Turkey; the dome spanning 34 metres represents the city of Istanbul (34 is the city's car plate number). The main dome is 3.12 metres wide, 7.77 metres high and weighs 4.5 tons. The mosque's gates are some of the largest inside a place of worship in the world - the main gate is 5 metres long, 6.5 metres high and weighs 6 tons.

The finial of the Çamlıca Mosque - the largest in the world - was coloured using nanotechnology.

=== Minarets ===
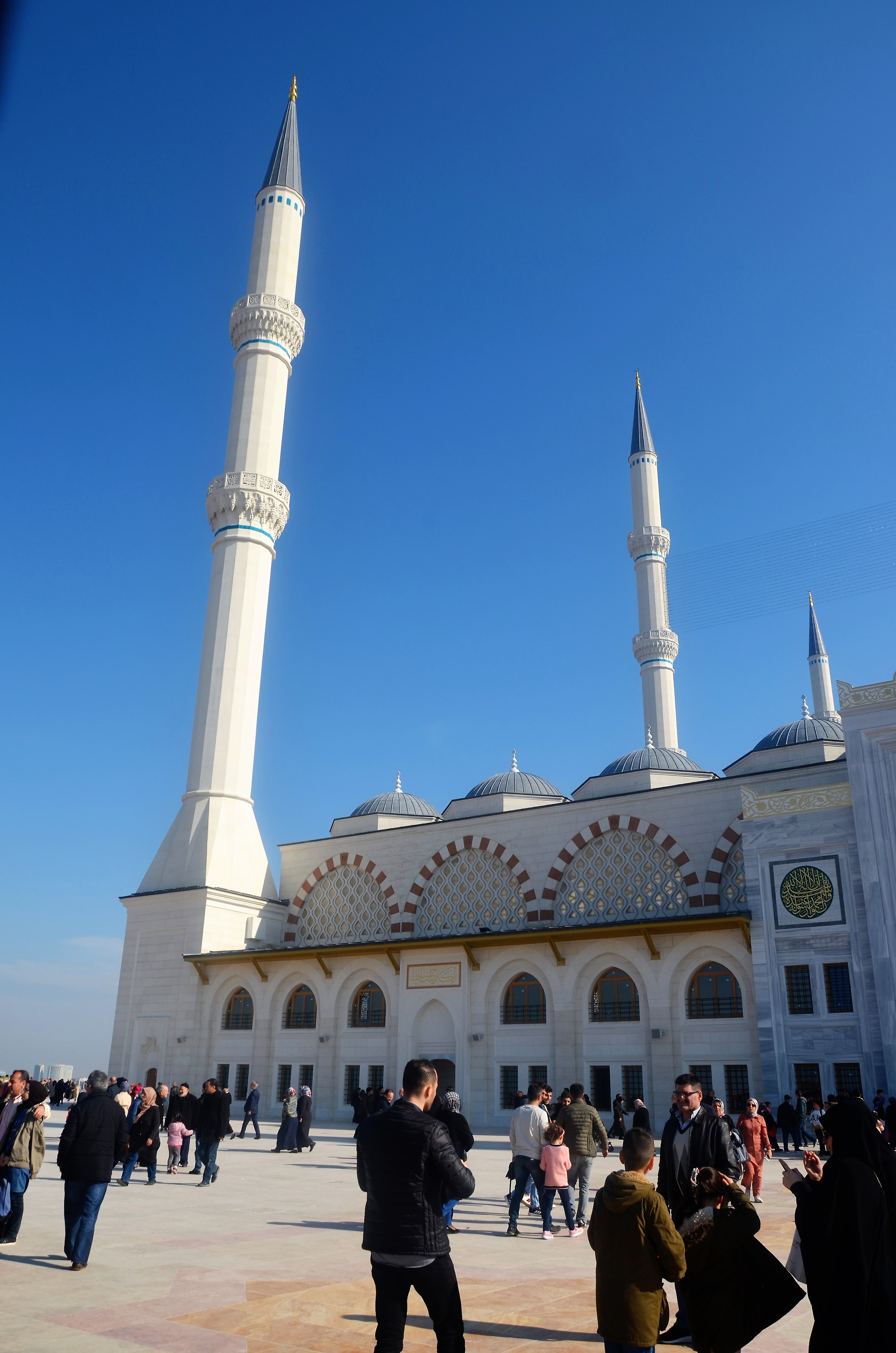
Two of the six minarets of Çamlıca Mosque which stand at 107.1m high. Photo taken by a tourist at ground level

Çamlıca Mosque has six minarets which represent the six articles of Islamic faith (iman). Four of the six minarets feature three balconies that stand 107.1 metres high in recognition of the Seljuk Victory at Manzikert in 1071. The other two minarets feature two balconies and are 90 metres high. Four of the minarets are centred around the central dome with the other two on the outer ends of the mosque.

=== Interior ===
The interior of the mosque was designed with a more minimalist approach. Ergin Külünk, president of the mosque’s construction association, has noted the designers’ use of "light, colour, glass, ornamentation and calligraphy" to make people feel “more spiritual” within the space.

=== Complex ===
Çamlıca Mosque features a museum, underground parking with space for 3,500 vehicles, an art gallery, library, conference hall, and childcare facilities. The art gallery covers 3,500 square metres while the library fills 3,000 square metres. The conference hall is able to seat up to 1,071 people and the mosque features eight art workshops.

In April 2022, a new Museum of Islamic Civilisations opened as part of the mosque complex.

== Female design and female-specific features ==
The design for Çamlıca Mosque was by two female architects, Bahar Mızrak and Hayriye Gül Totu, who planned to create a 'female-friendly' mosque that uses positive affirmation for women. The planning incorporated a separate space for women to perform ablutions before prayer, a separate elevator to the prayer spaces and a childcare facility. The separate prayer space for women is located in the central hall of the mosque and holds up to 600 worshippers. The childcare facility has a playground area and a car park. The architects stated that they wanted to change the tradition of more men going to mosques than women by designing Çamlıca Mosque to be 'female-friendly'.

== Notable funerals ==
The first notable funeral to attract crowds to the mosque was the one held for writer Kadir Mısıroğlu on 6 May 2019.

== Controversy ==
As one of several megaprojects embarked on by the ruling AK Party in the second half of the 2010s, the Çamlıca Mosque attracted a great deal of attention, as often negative as positive.

Namo Abdulla of Rudaw, a Kurdish media network, claimed that its construction is against the principle of secularism in Turkey.

== Gallery ==
Main entrance courtyard

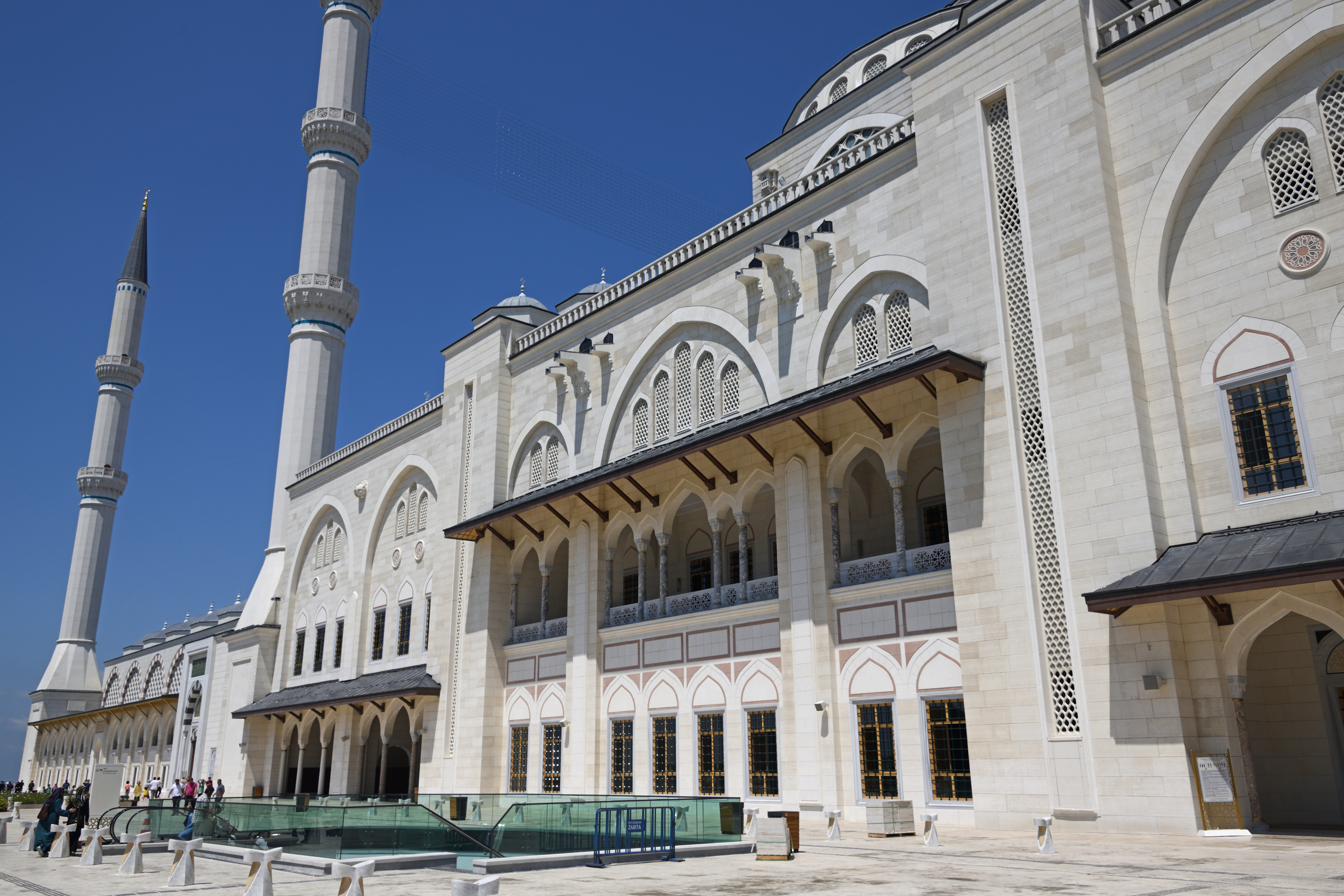
West side

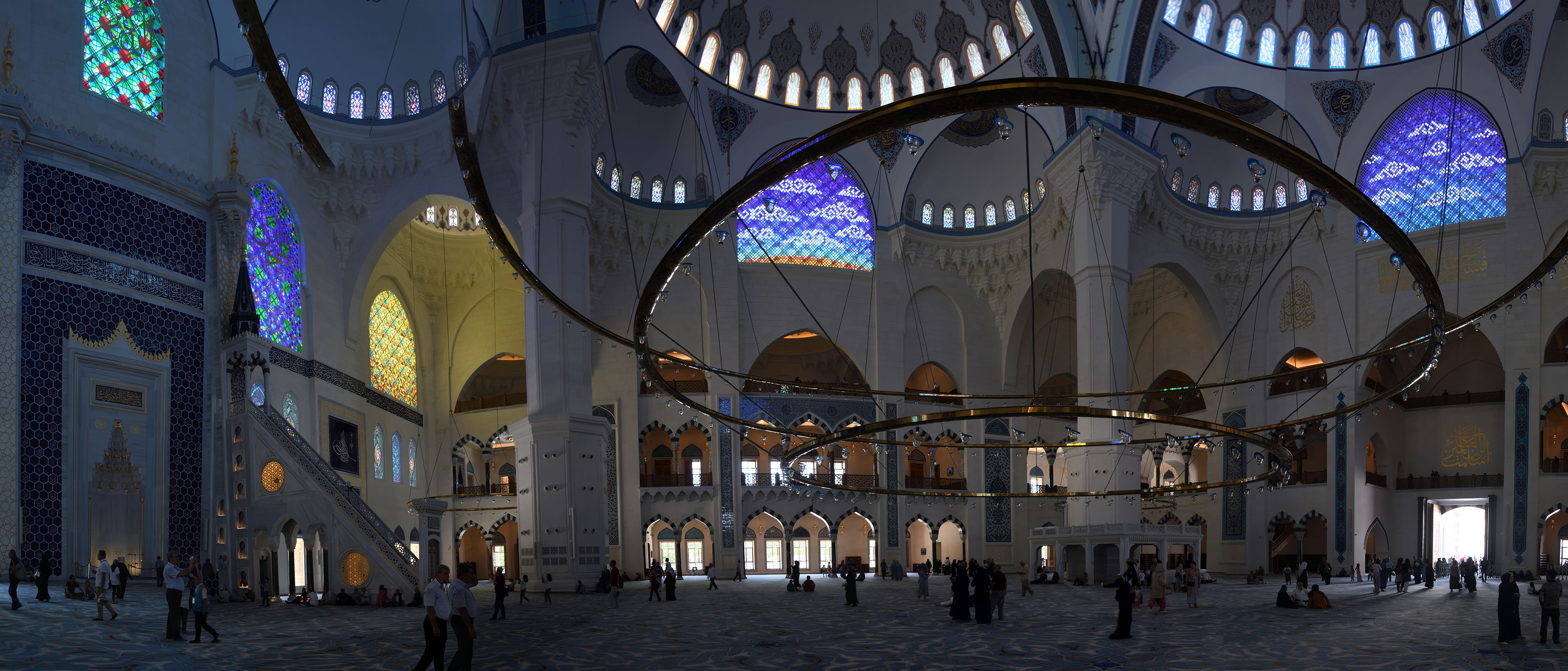
Panorama

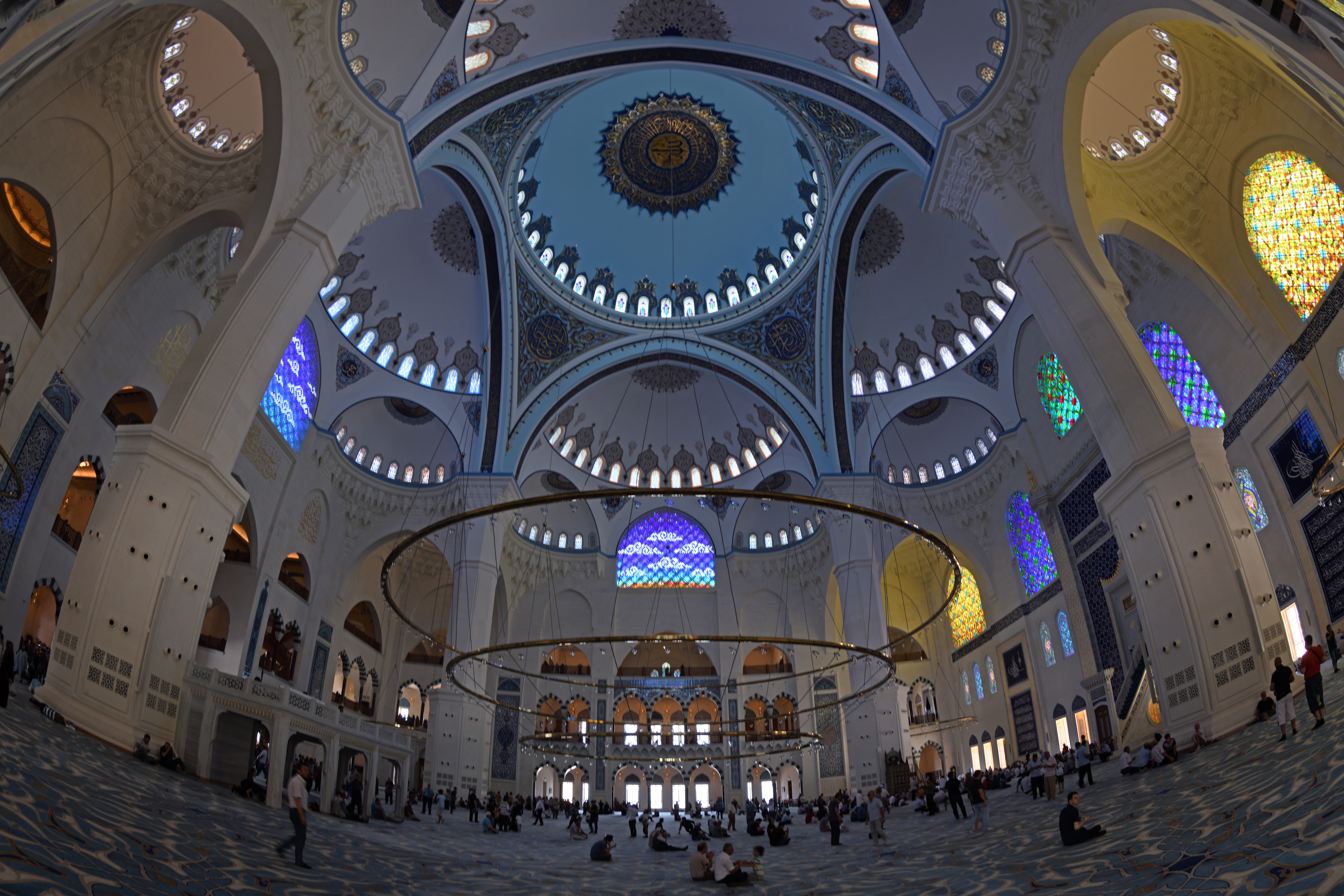
General view

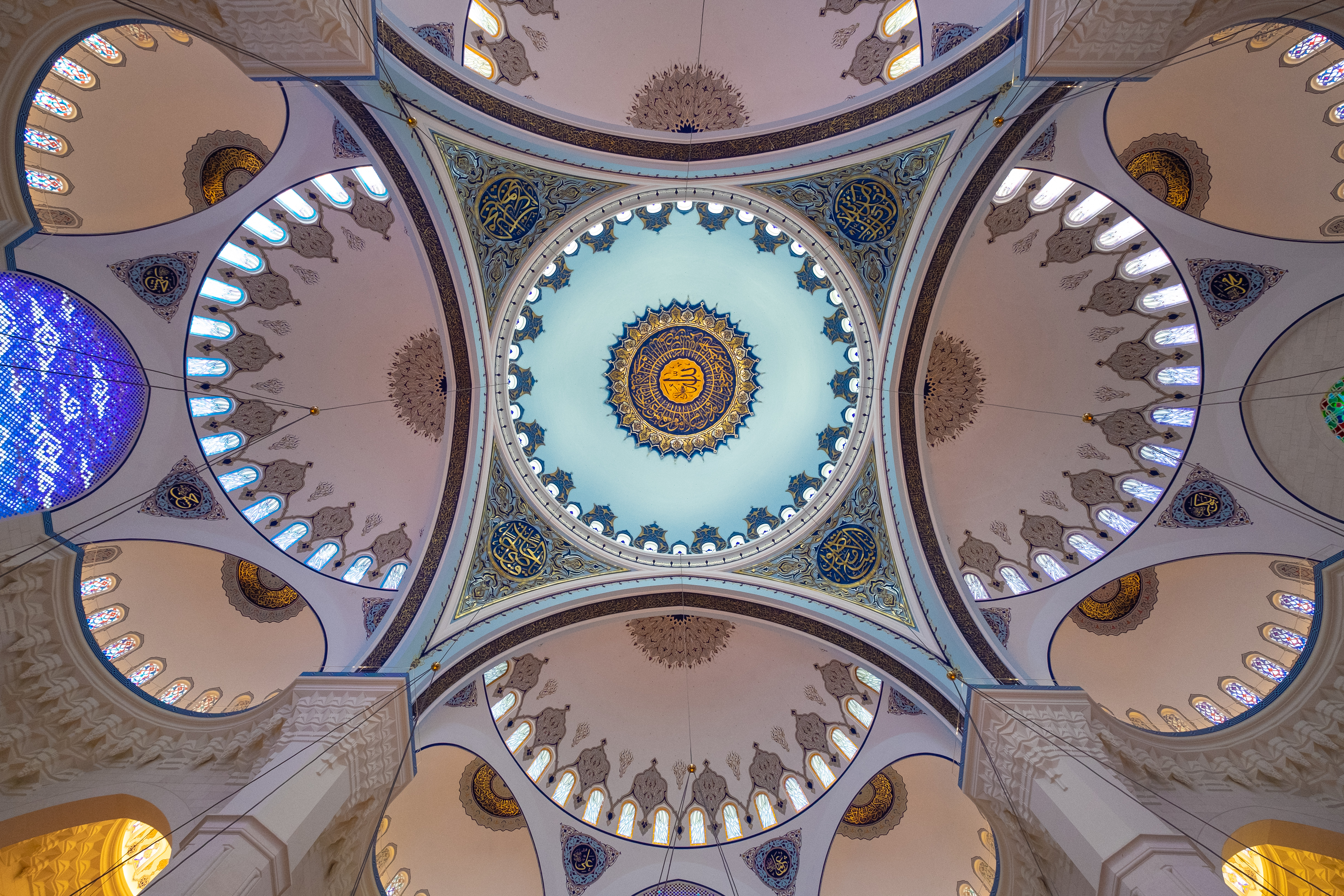
Interior with main dome in centre

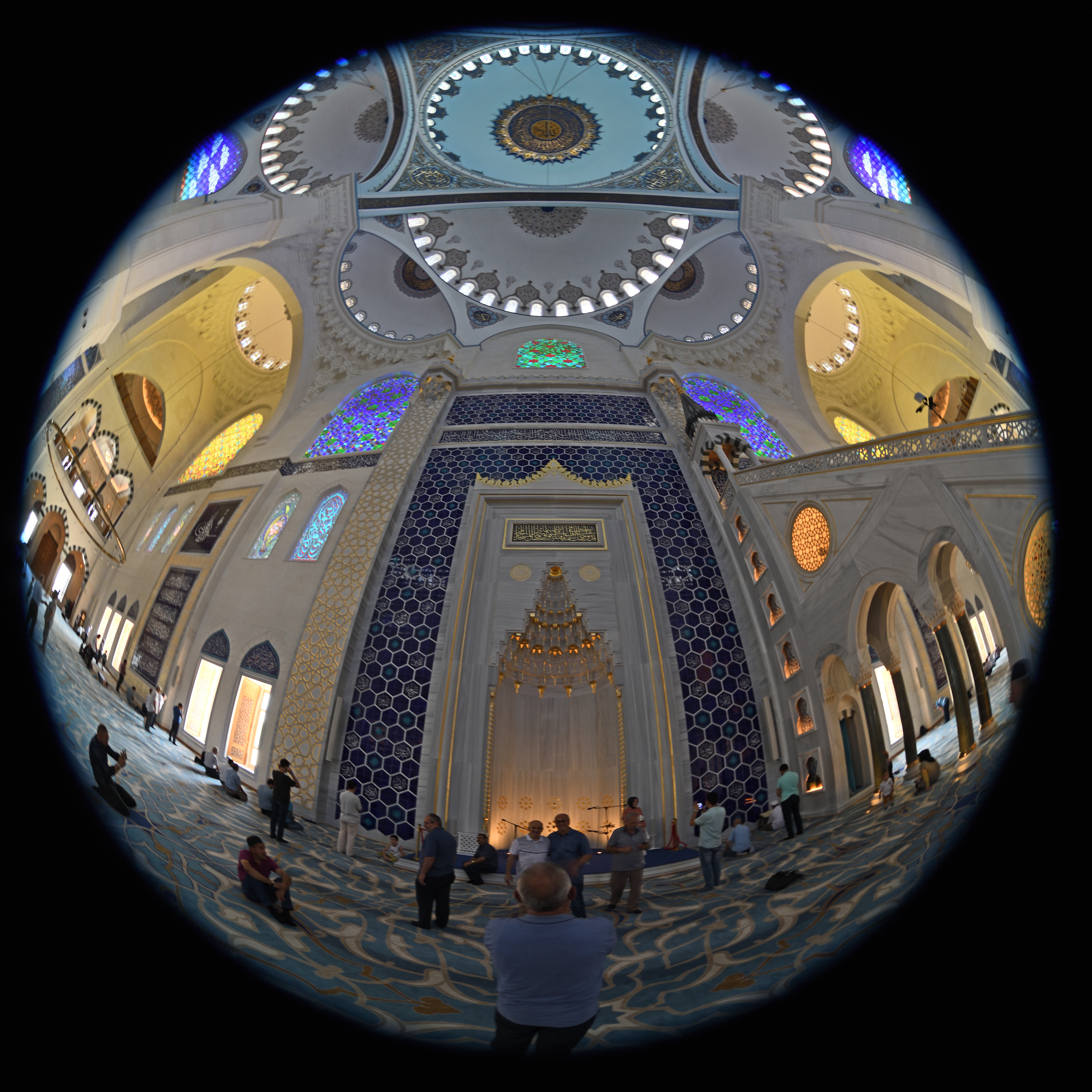
Mihrab

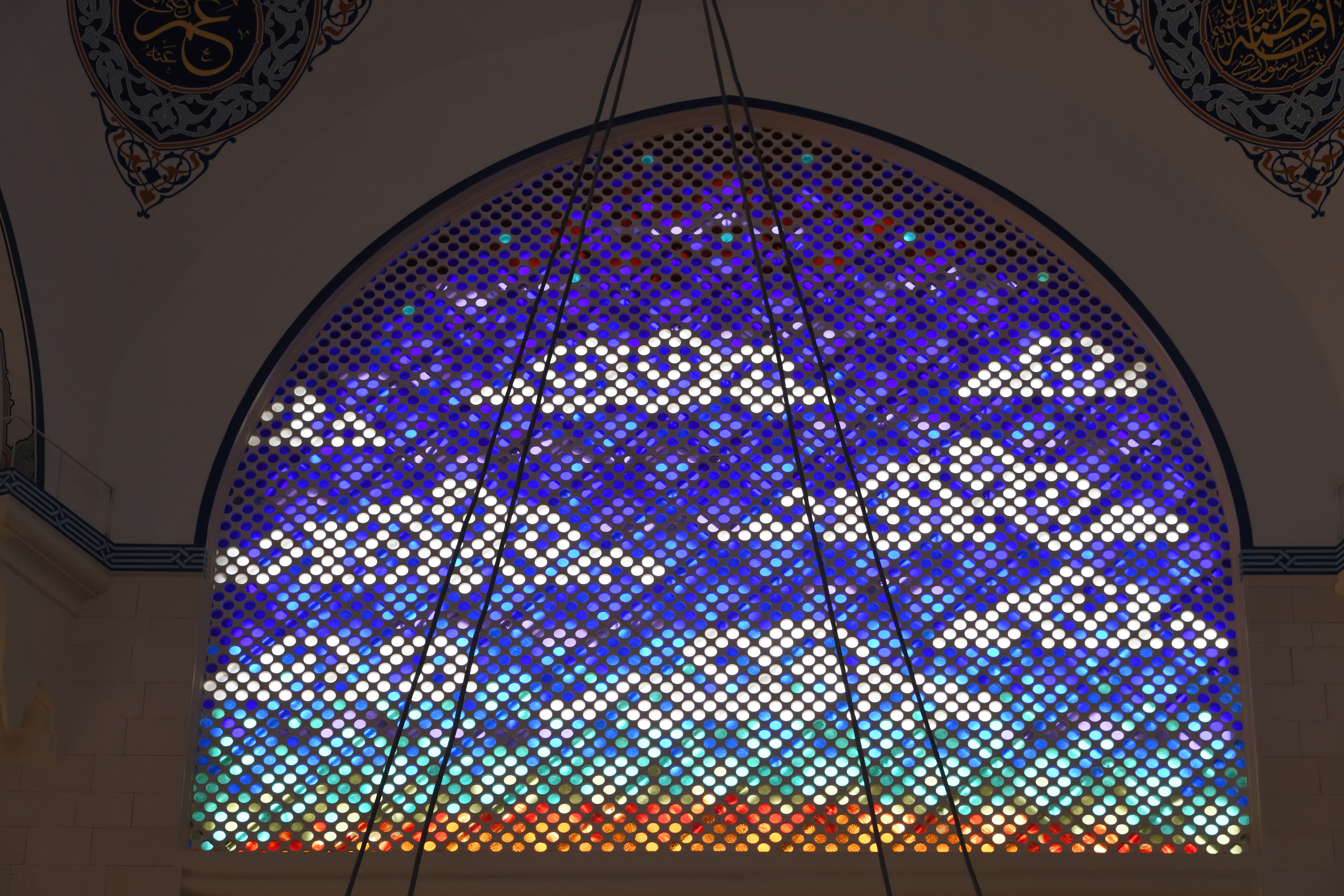
Window

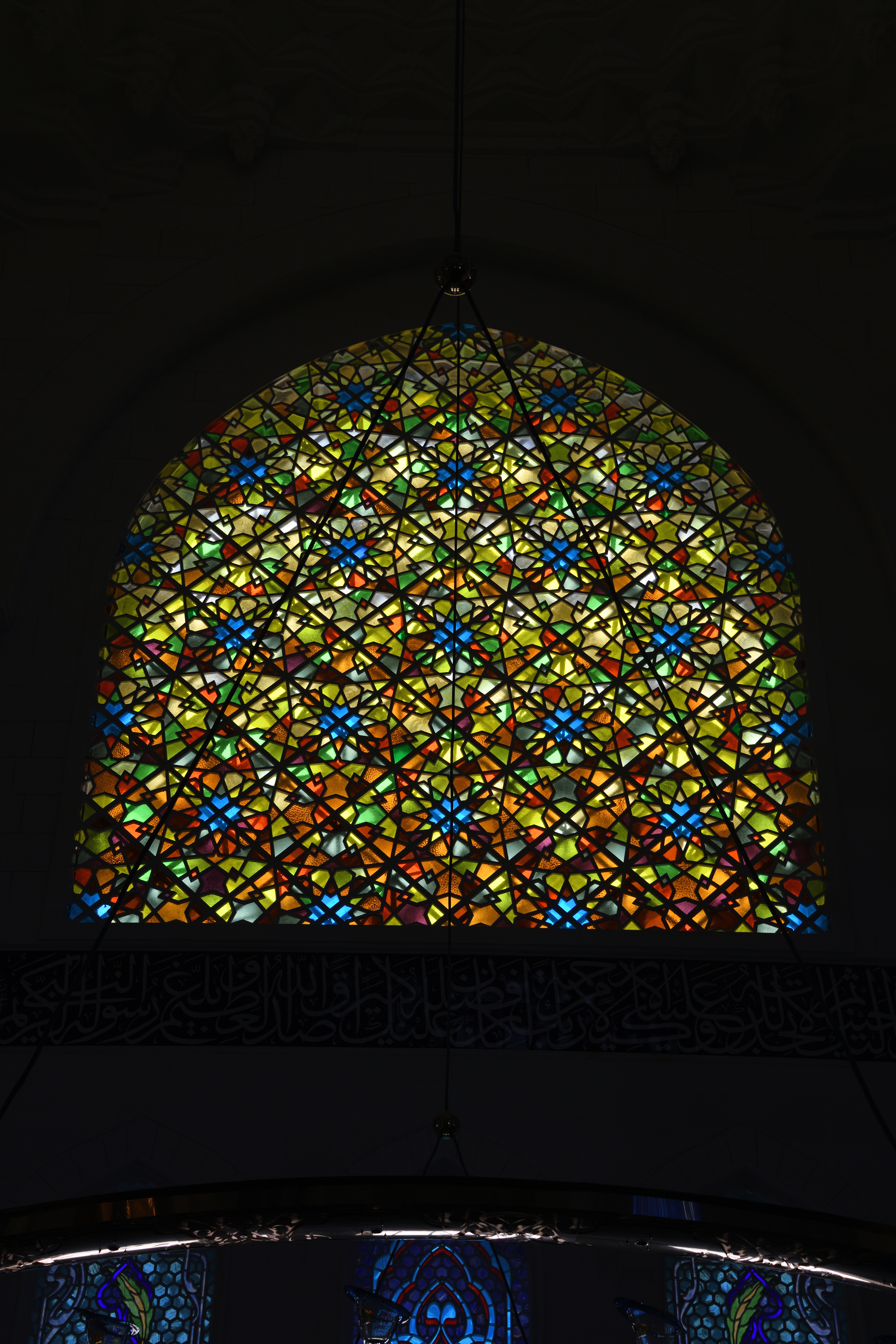
Window

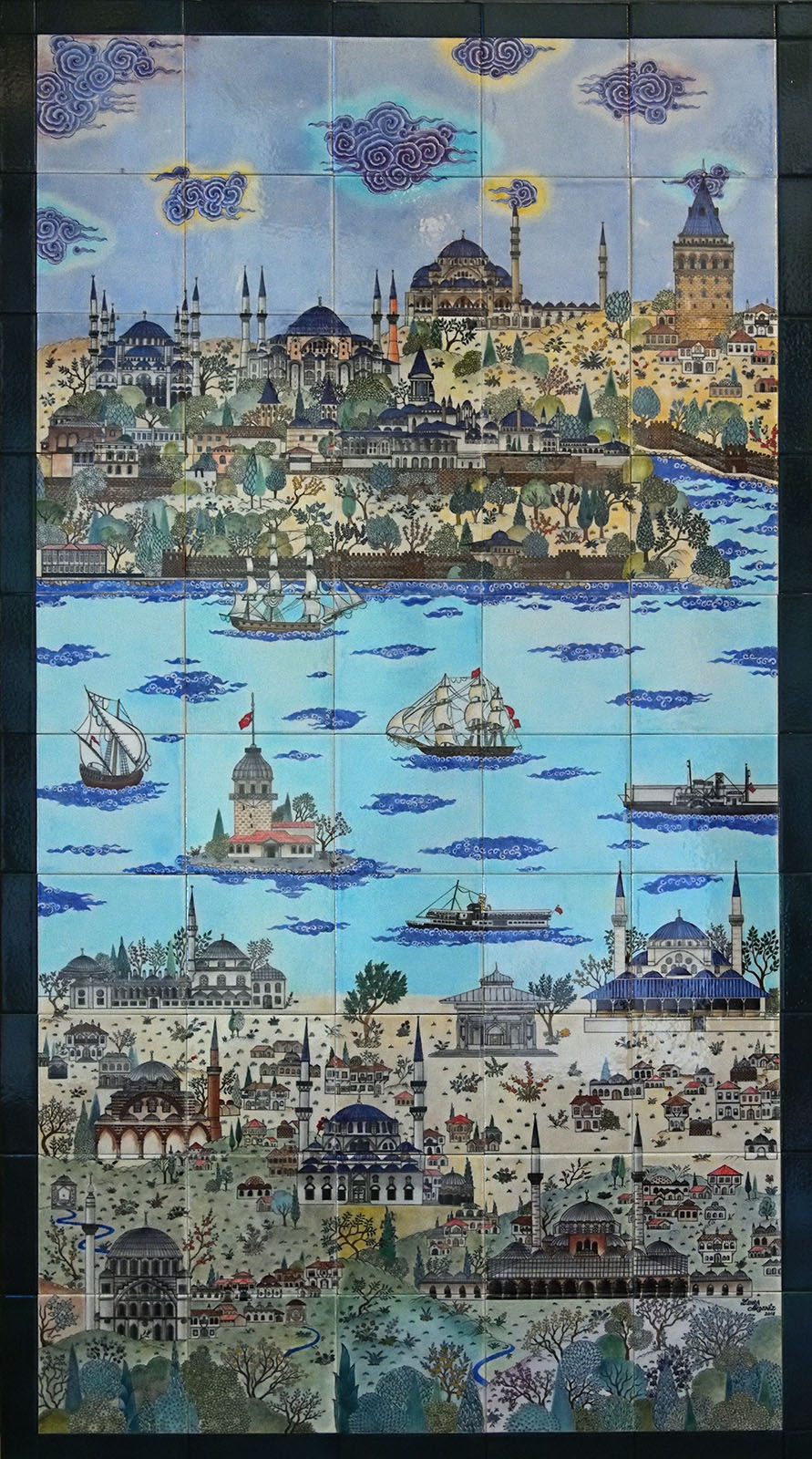
Tile panel

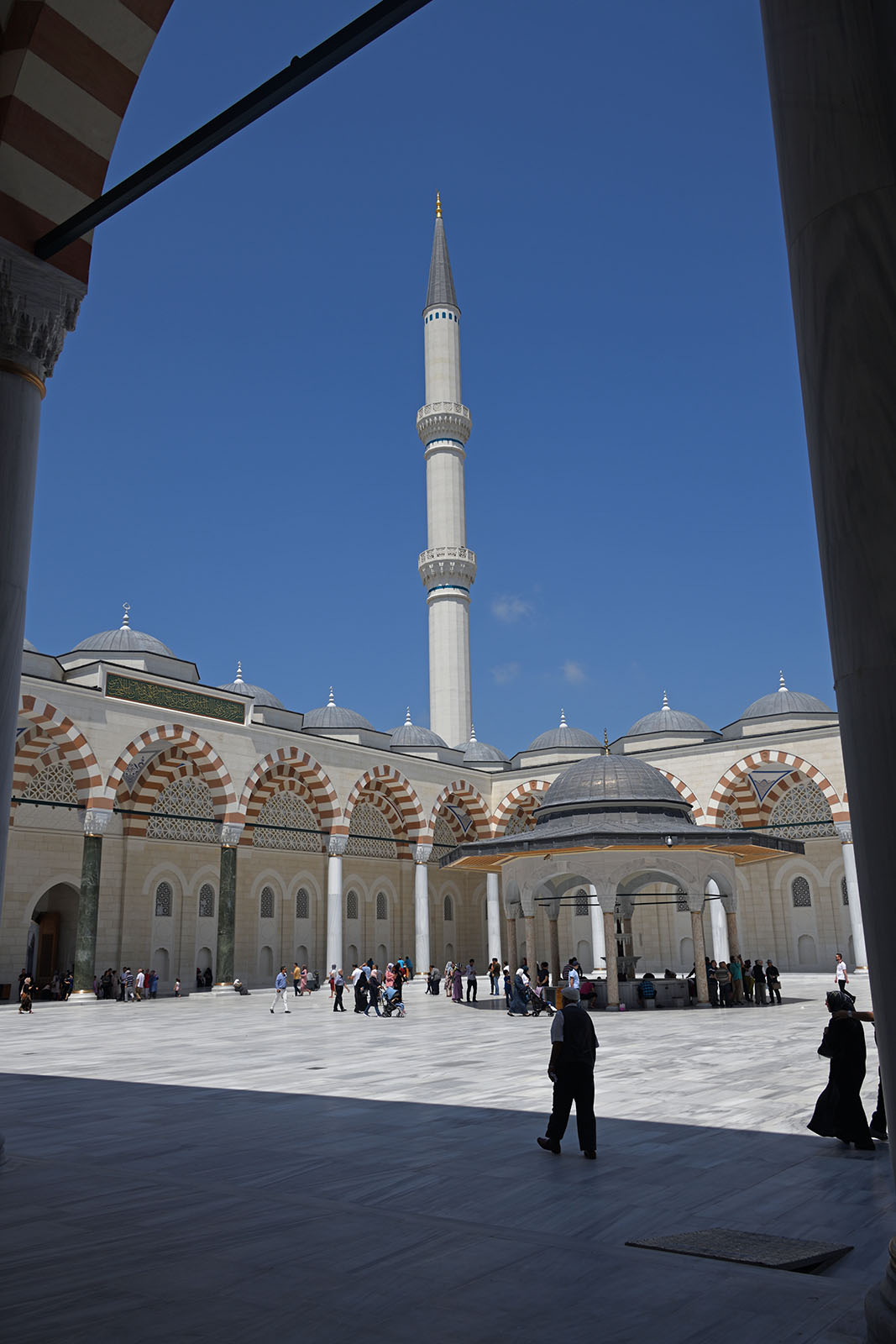
Courtyard

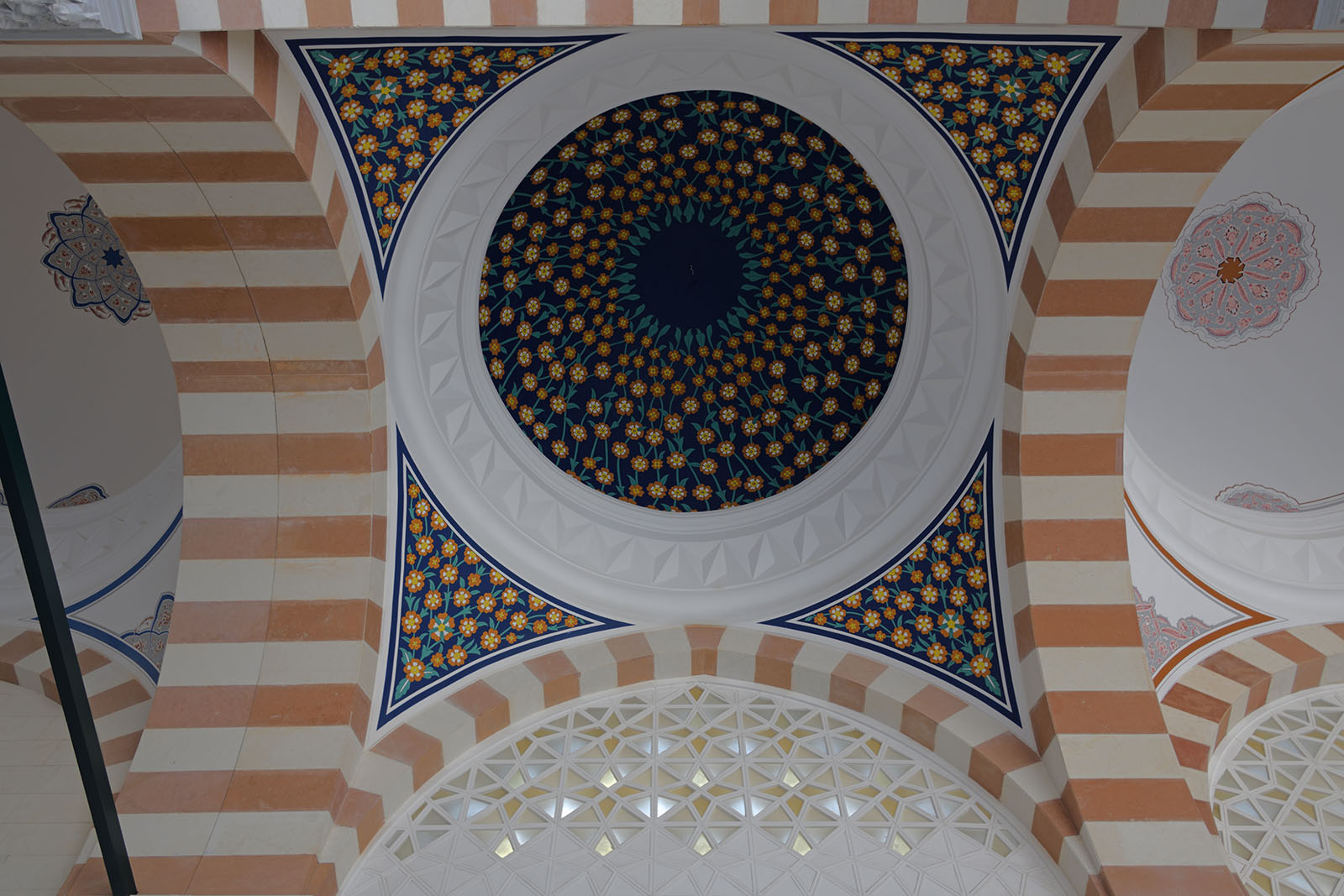
Decoration in courtyard

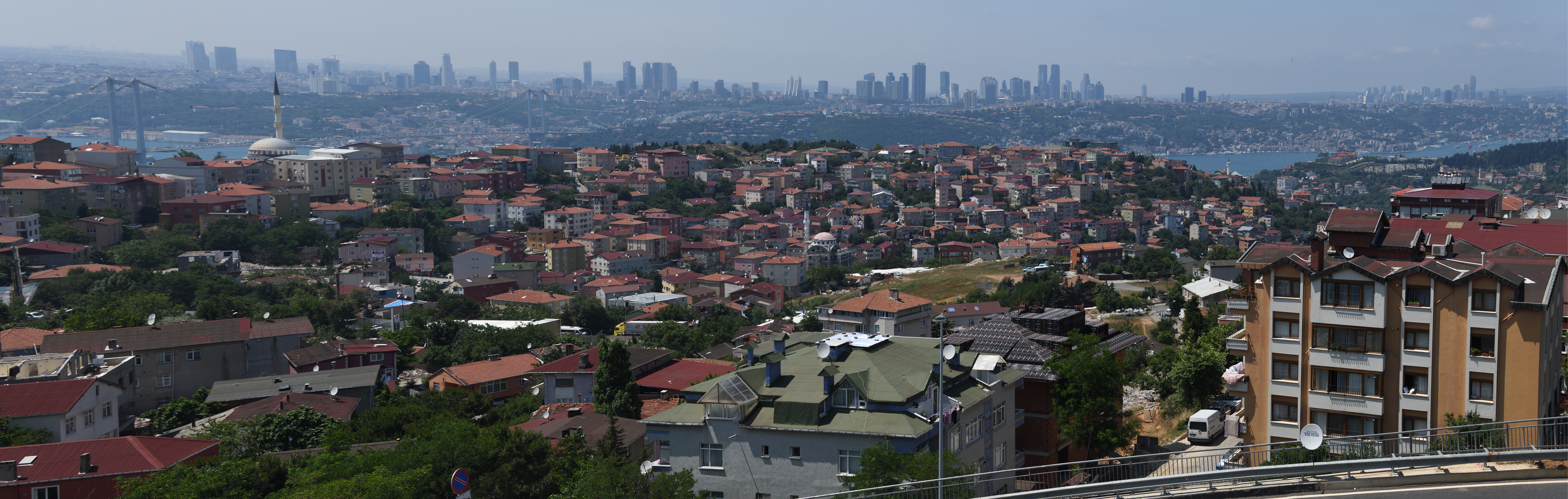
View from north side of platform

== See also ==
- Hagia Sophia
- Sultan Ahmed Mosque
- Taksim Mosque
- Mimar Sinan Mosque
- Şakirin Mosque, first female-designed mosque in modern times
- Barbaros Hayrettin Pasha Mosque
- Islam in Turkey
- List of mosques in Istanbul
- List of mosques in Turkey
- List of largest mosques
- List of tallest domes
