= Barbaros Hayrettin Pasha Mosque =

Mosque in Beşiktaş, Istanbul, Turkey

- Barbaros Hayrettin Paşa Camii
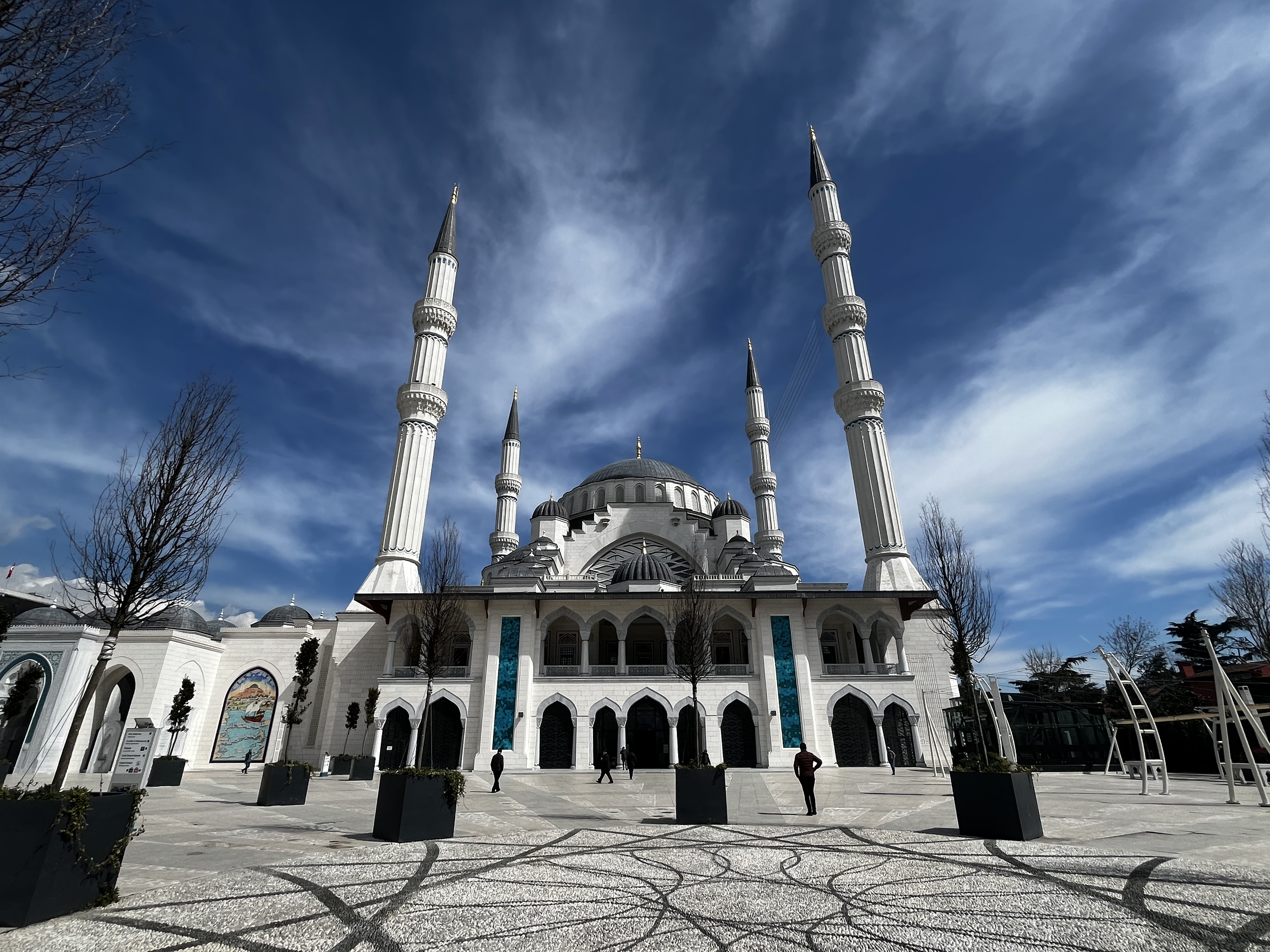
- Side view of the mosque from the adjacent square, March 2024

Religion
- Affiliation: Islam

Location
- Location: Levent, Beşiktaş, Istanbul
- Interactive map of Barbaros Hayrettin Pasha Mosque
- Coordinates: 41°4′42.7″N 29°0′52.1″E

Architecture
- Style: Neo-Ottoman architecture
- Completed: 12 May 2023; 3 years ago
- Construction cost: 750 million Turkish lira (~50 million US dollars)

Specifications
- Capacity: 20,000
- Domes: One main, two half
- Dome height (outer): 44 m
- Dome dia. (outer): 24 m
- Minaret: 4
- Minaret height: Two 79 m, Two 92 m

Barbaros Hayrettin Pasha Mosque is a mosque complex in the Levent neighborhood of Istanbul, Turkey. Architect Sinan's Suleymaniye Mosque in Istanbul formed the inspiration for the design of the mosque. Maritime and shipping motifs were used in the project in honor of Hayreddin Barbarossa and his irregular sailors — Levends — which gave the area its name. The mosque complex is composed of an underground parking lot (for about 1000 cars), a workshop, a library, a multipurpose hall, and a dining hall, and can hold up to 20,000 worshippers.

The foundation of the mosque was laid on July 3, 2020, and President Erdogan held the inauguration ceremony 35 months later following Friday congregational prayer on May 12, 2023.

== See also ==
- Taksim Mosque
- Çamlıca Mosque
