= Şefik Birkiye =

Turkish architect

- Born: November 10, 1954 (age 71); Ankara, Turkey
- Education: La Cambre School of Architecture; University of Louvain
- Occupation: Architect
- Buildings: Radisson Collection Hotel, Grand Place Brussels (Brussels); Monte-Carlo Bay Hotel (Monaco); City2 Shopping Mall (Brussels); Presidential Complex (Turkey); Central Bank Tower (Turkey); Taksim Mosque (Turkey)
- Website: https://sefikbirkiye.com/

Şefik Birkiye (born 1954) is a Turkish-Belgian architect who has designed buildings in Belgium, France, Luxembourg, Switzerland, Monaco, Egypt, and Turkey. He is the founder of Vizzion Architects (originally named Atelier d'Art Urbain), an architecture studio that has been operating in Brussels since 1979, as well as Vizzion Europe, an international real estate development company.

== Early life and education ==
Birkiye was born in Ankara in 1954. At the age of 17, he moved to Brussels in order to pursue his academic interests. In 1978, he graduated in architecture from the La Cambre School of Architecture. In 1981, he then went to study at the University of Louvain where he obtained a master's degree in urban planning.

== Career ==
Vizzion Architects

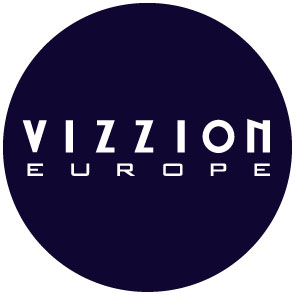
Vizzion Europe

In 1979, Birkiye founded Vizzion Architects (originally named Atelier d'Art Urbain), a team with several high-profile projects in Brussels. After many years of success and a growing reputation in the industry, Birkiye founded the umbrella company Vizzion Europe to expand internationally and develop real estate projects. His work has received the prestigious MIPIM Award in 1998 (Jardin des Fonderies) and 1999 (Green Island Office Complex), as well as a nomination in 2006 (Monte Carlo Bay Hotel & Resort). Vizzion Europe has designed over 8 million m² of property across Europe, 4 million of which is situated in Brussels.

== Projects ==
- Radisson Collection Hotel, Grand Place – Brussels, Belgium (1990)
- Jardin des Fonderies Apartments – Brussels, Belgium (1998)
- City2 Shopping Mall – Brussels, Belgium (1999)
- Green Island Office Complex – Brussels, Belgium (2000)
- Monte-Carlo Bay Hotel & Resort – Monte Carlo, Monaco (2005)
- Presidential Complex – Istanbul, Turkey (2014)
- Taksim Mosque – Istanbul, Turkey (2021)
- Central Bank Tower – Istanbul, Turkey (2024)
