= Hagia Triada Church, Istanbul =

Church in Turkey

Hagia Triada Greek Orthodox Church
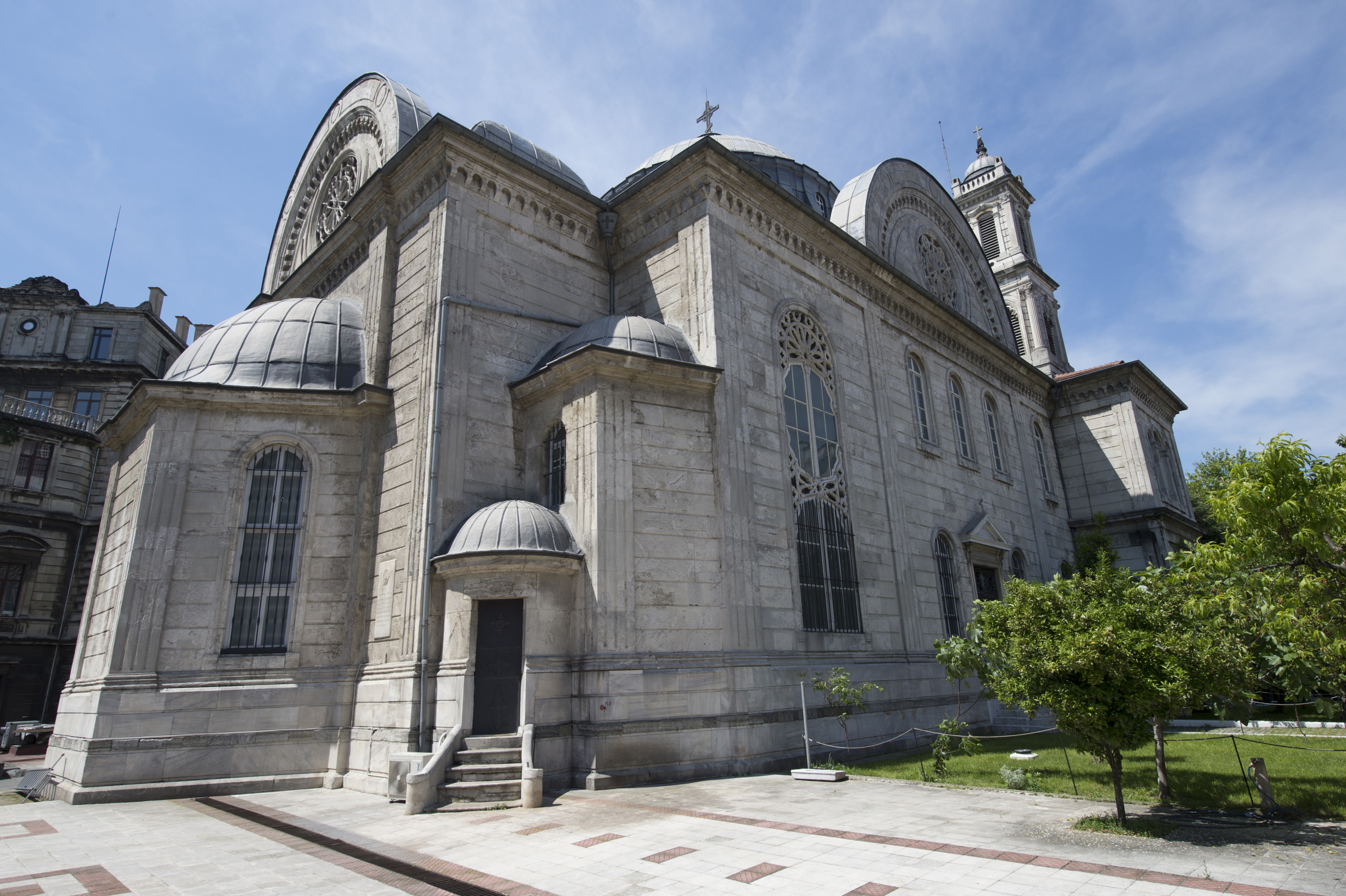
- Hagia Triada Church

- Location within Istanbul Fatih
- 41.0355°N 28.9842°E
- Location: Beyoğlu, Istanbul, Turkey
- Denomination: Greek Orthodox

History
- Dedicated: 1880

Architecture
- Architect: Konstantis Yolasığmazis
- Architectural type: Domed single nave basilica
- Style: Neo-Baroque and Neo-Byzantine
- Groundbreaking: 13 August 1876
- Completed: 14 September 1880

Administration
- Metropolis: Patriarchate of Constantinople

Hagia Triada ("Holy Trinity"; Greek: Ιερός Ναός Αγίας Τριάδος, romanized: Ierós Naós Agías Triádos; Turkish: Aya Triada Rum Ortodoks Kilisesi) is a Greek Orthodox church in Istanbul, Turkey. The building was erected in 1880 and is considered the largest Greek Orthodox shrine in Istanbul today. It is still in use by the Greek community of Istanbul. It has about 150 parishioners. The church is located in the district of Beyoğlu, in the neighborhood of Katip Çelebi, on Meşelik sokak, near Taksim Square.

== History ==
The property where the Church stands used to be the site of a Greek Orthodox cemetery and hospital. This was demolished in order to build the Church. Its construction, based on the designs of the Ottoman Greek architect P. Kampanaki, began on 13 August 1876 and was completed on 14 September 1880. The Church is built in neo-baroque style with elements of a basilica, and with the unusual features of twin bell towers, a large dome and a neo-Gothic facade. The Hagia Triada was the first domed Christian church that was allowed to be built in Istanbul after the Fall of Constantinople in 1453.

Architectural elements such as the dome of the church were only allowed after 1839 during a period known as the Tanzimat under which the restrictions limiting the Freedom of Speech for minorities were loosened and domes were allowed to be constructed as design features of Christian churches.

The paintings and decorations of the church's interior are the work of painter Sakellarios Megaklis, while the marble works and designs were created by sculptor Alexandros Krikelis. On Church grounds there is also a school, Zapyon Rum Lisesi (Zappeion Greek Lyceum), which continues to serve the Greek community of Istanbul. In the church courtyard there are additional buildings dedicated to social services and also a sacred spring.

=== Damage and restoration ===
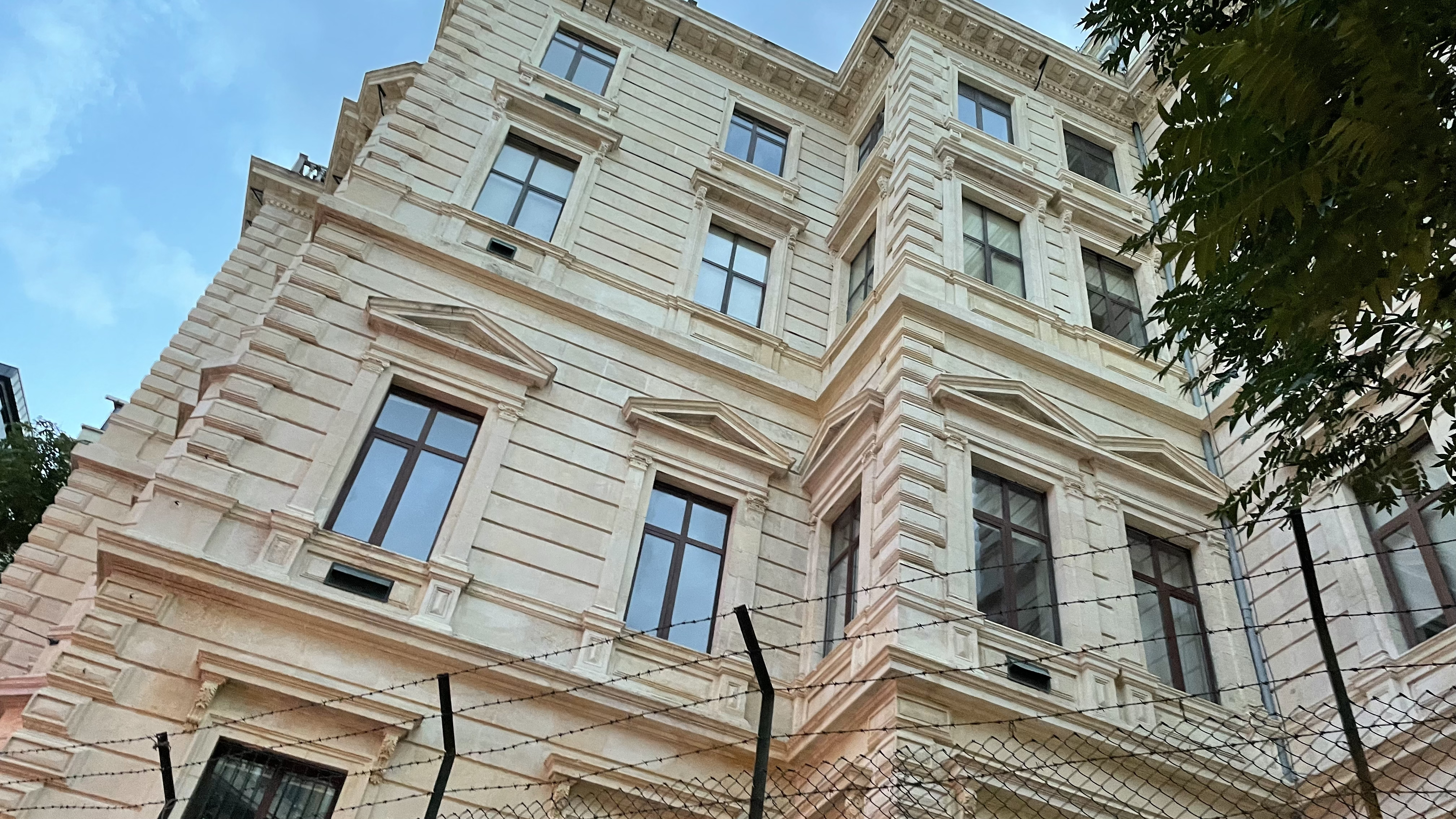
Surrounding buildings of the Hagia Triada after restoration.

The Hagia Triada Church was damaged and set on fire during the Istanbul pogrom of 6–7 September 1955 by an organized mob attack directed primarily at Istanbul's Greek minority. During the unrest, the Church was wrecked and pillaged but withstood an attempted arson attack by the rioters. According to ethnic Armenian actor Nubar Terziyan, who witnessed the incident, the mob arrived at the Church and started the fire by dumping kerosene onto the Church and lighting it with burning sticks.

Decades after the events, industrialist and businessman Panagiotis Angelopoulos, who was given the titles Megas Archon Logothetes and Great Benefactor by the Patriarchate of Constantinople, donated the sum of US$90,000 to Patriarch Bartholomew; the funds were used for repairs and renovations of the church which lasted two years.

The inauguration took place on 23 March 2003 and the official opening of the gate of the church was attended by many officials of the Greek Orthodox Church as well as the consuls general of Greece, France and Germany and hundreds of people from Istanbul and Greece. The inaugural speech was delivered by Patriarch Bartholomew. The church is now used on a daily basis.

== Gallery ==
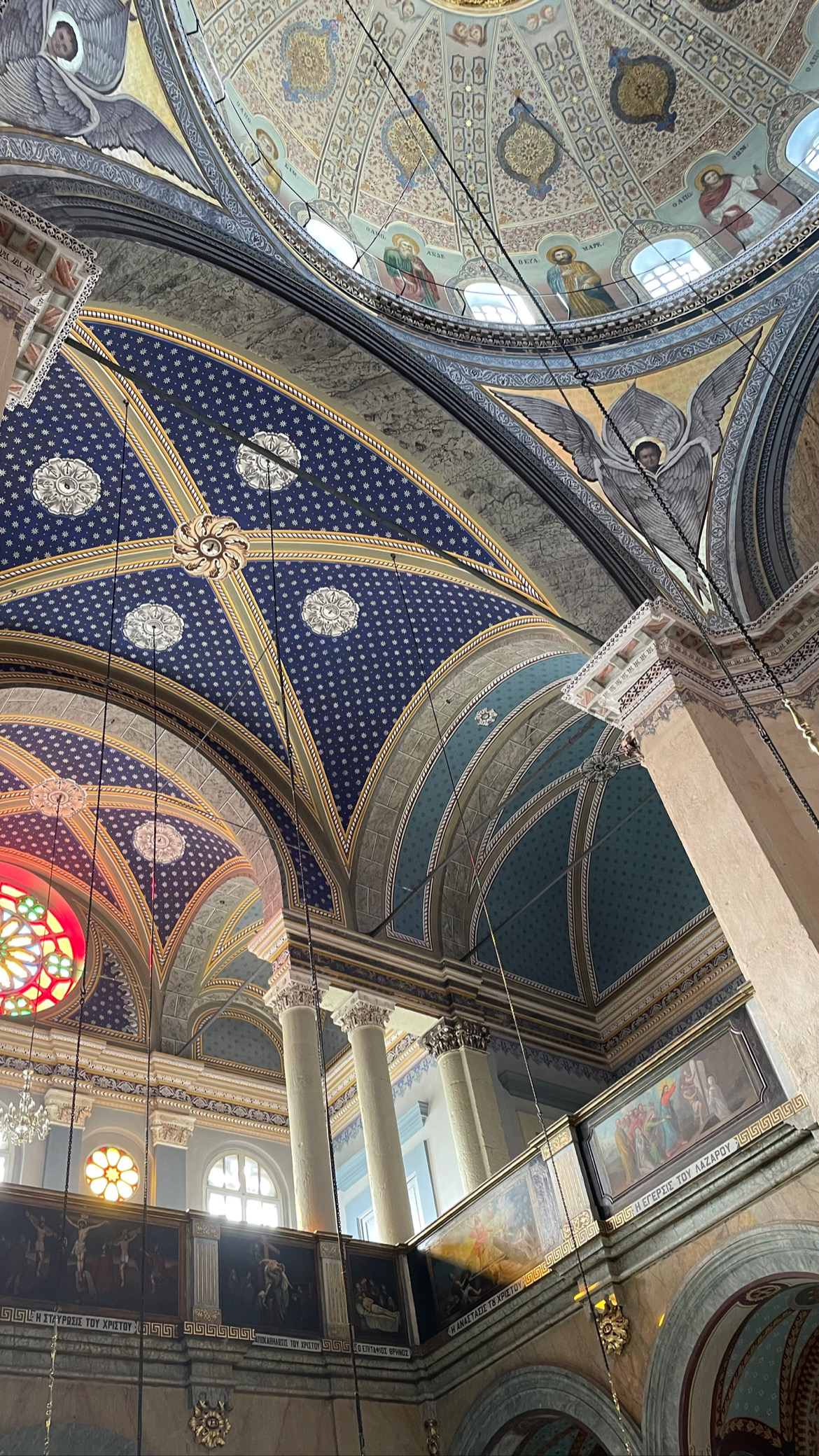
Dome of Hagia Triada Greek Orthodox Church

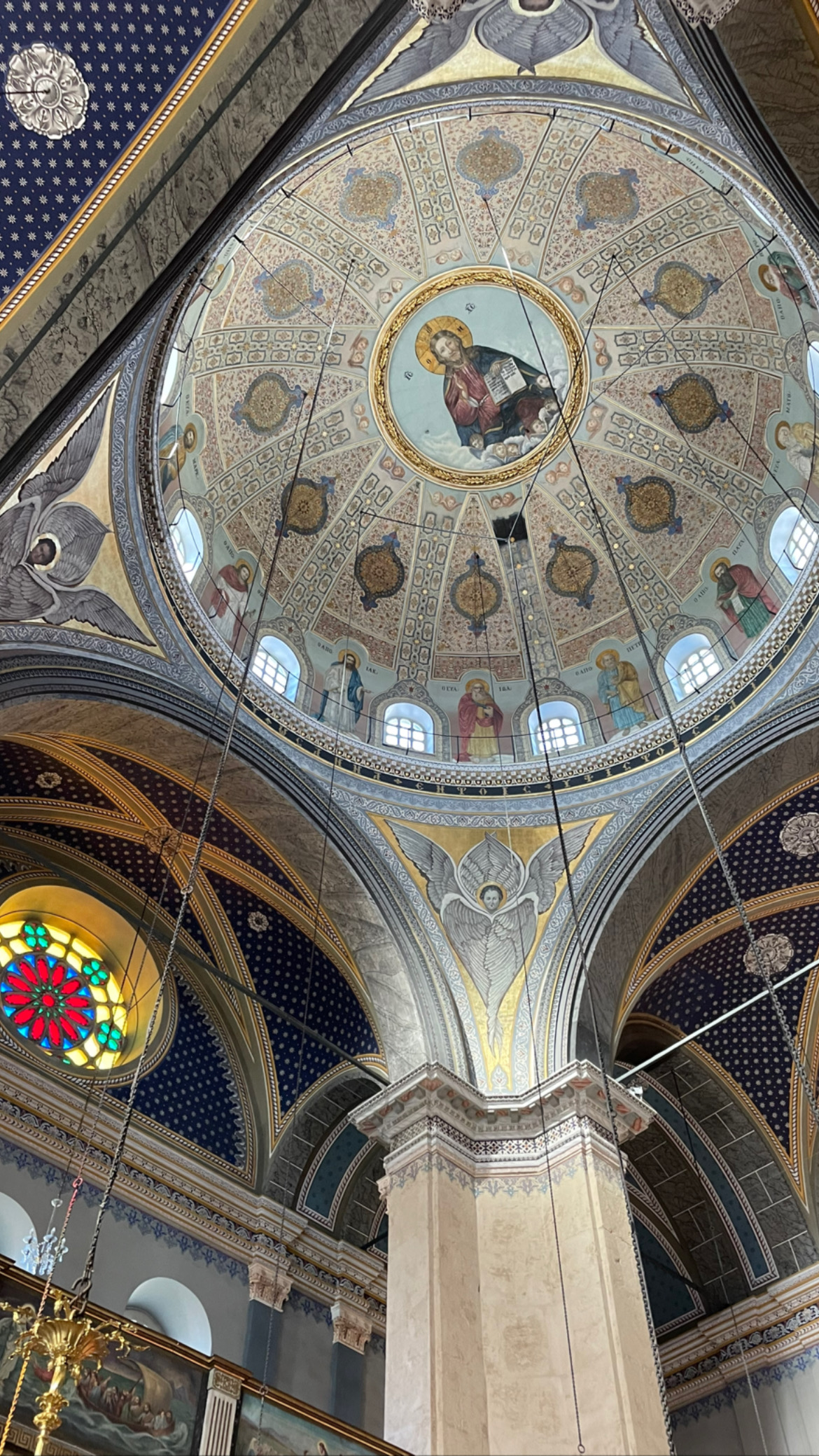
Dome of Hagia Triada Greek Orthodox Church

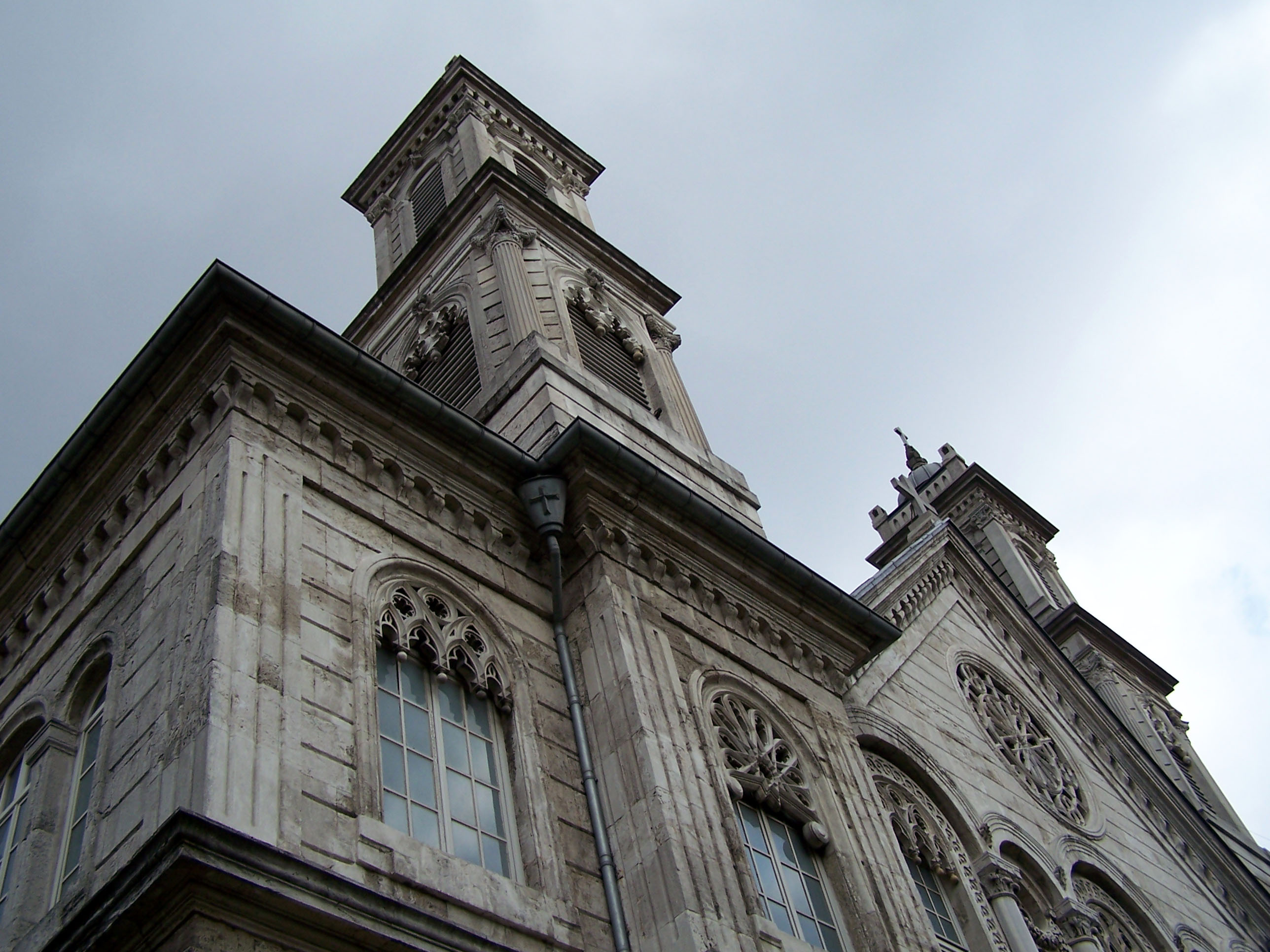

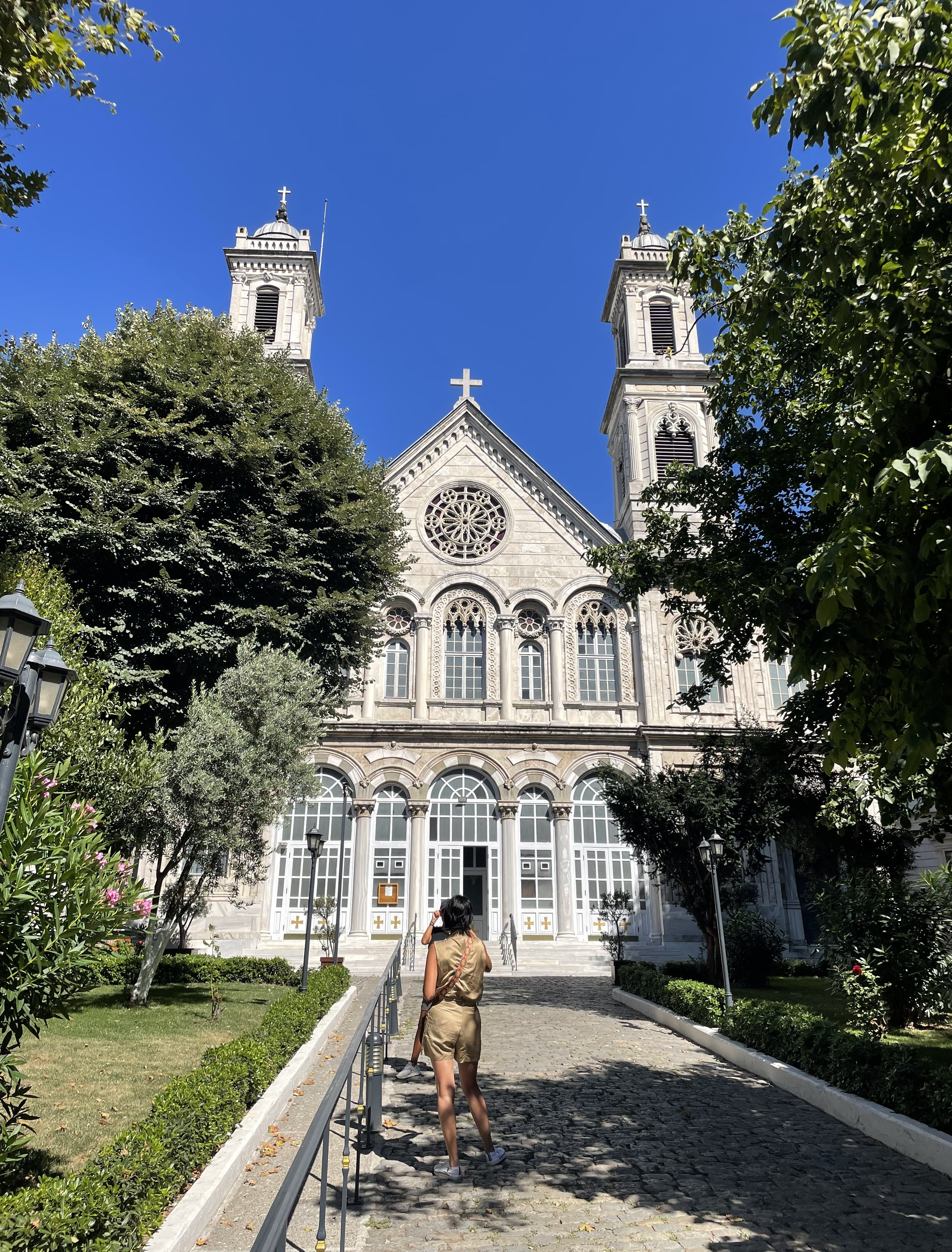

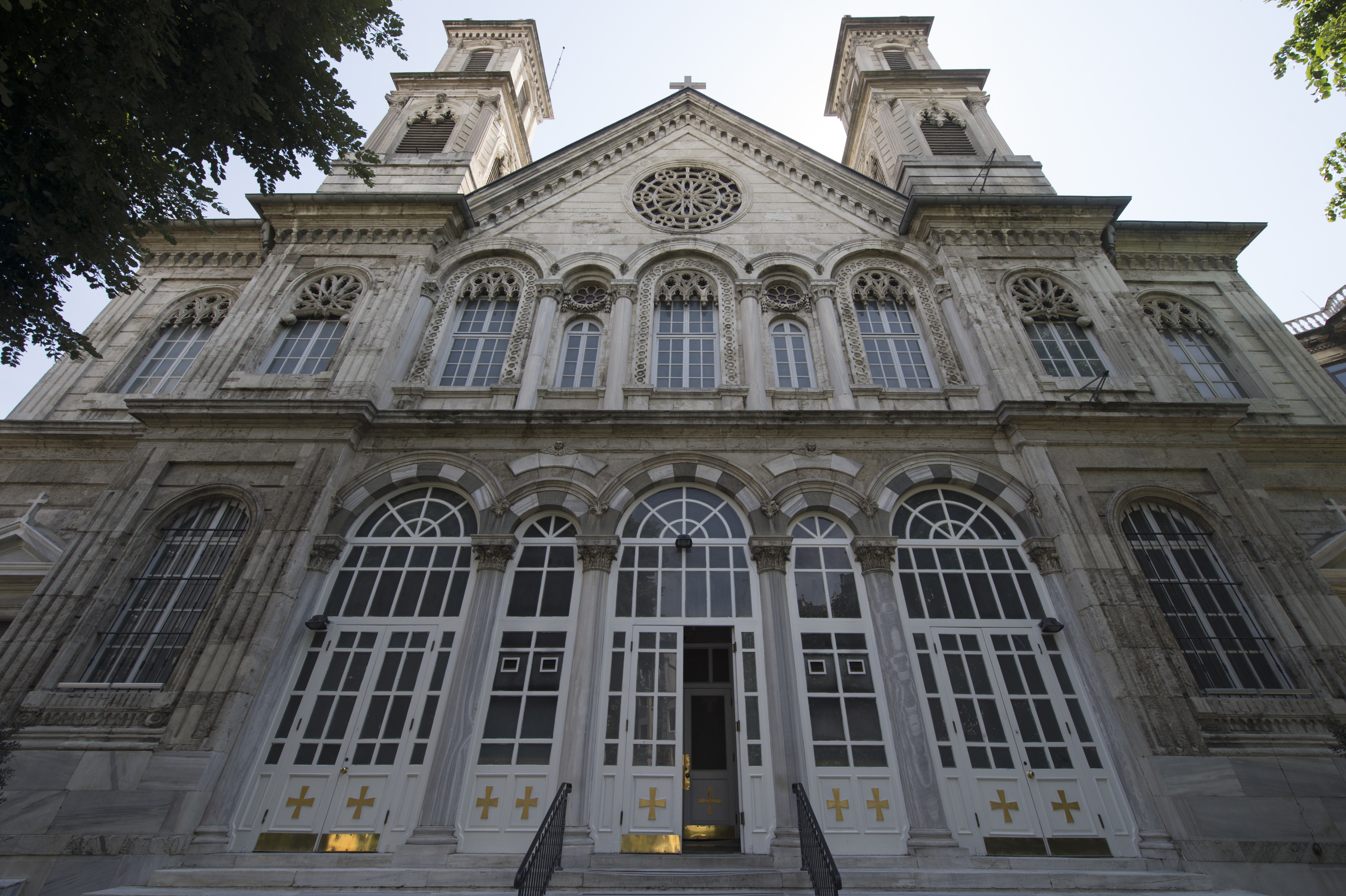
Hagia Triada Greek Orthodox Church front

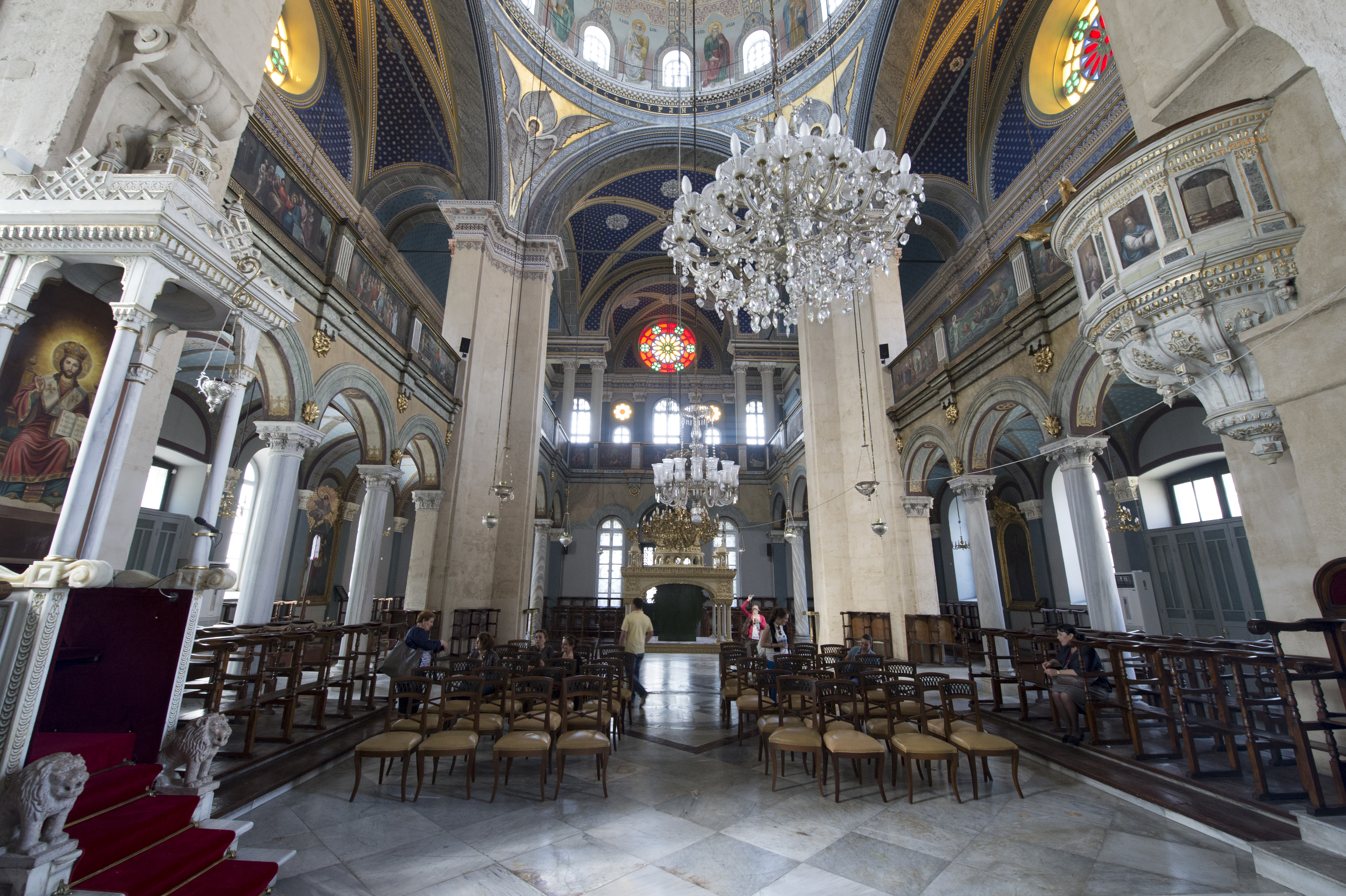
Hagia Triada Greek Orthodox Church interior

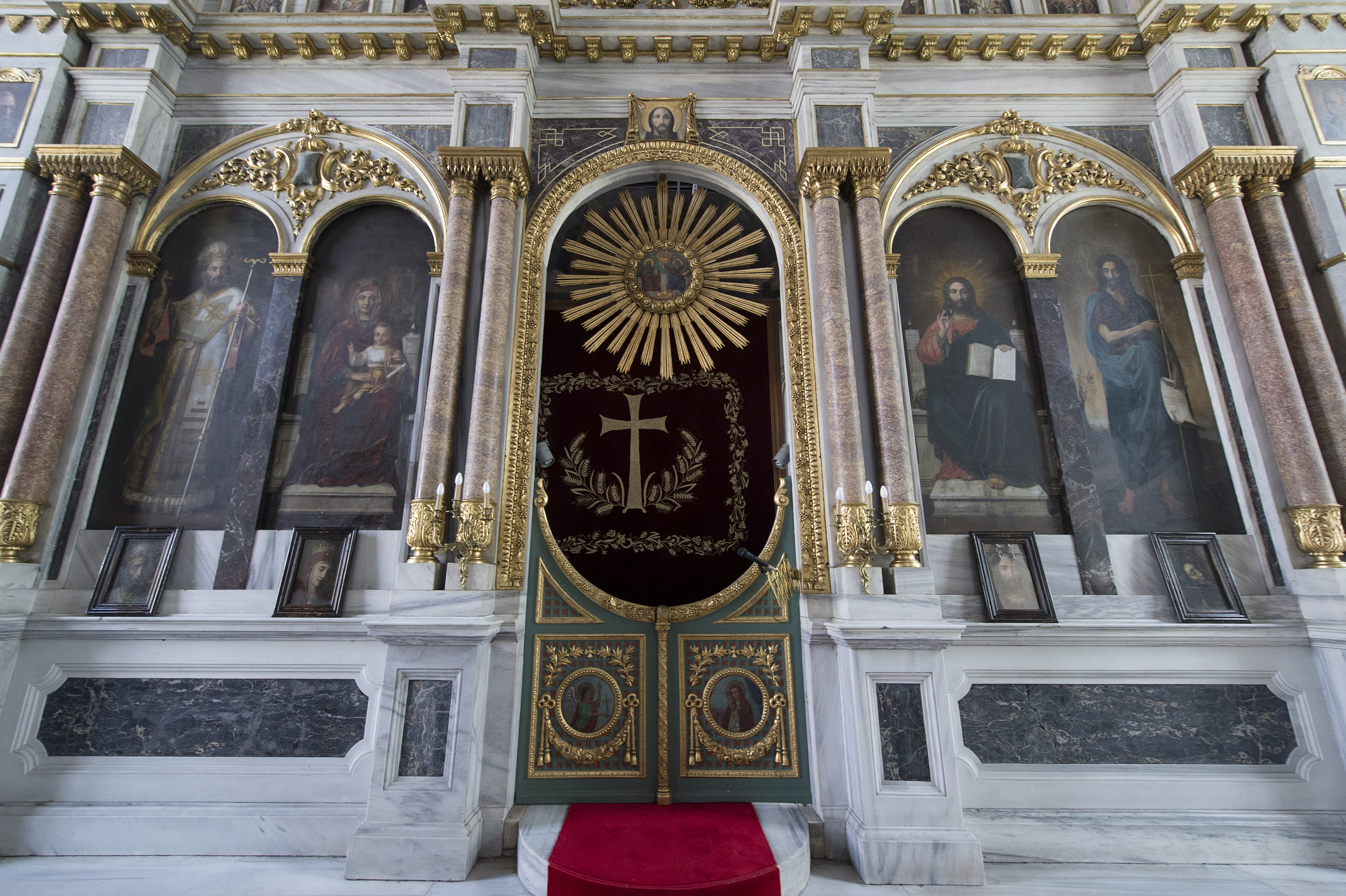
Hagia Triada Greek Orthodox Church iconostasis

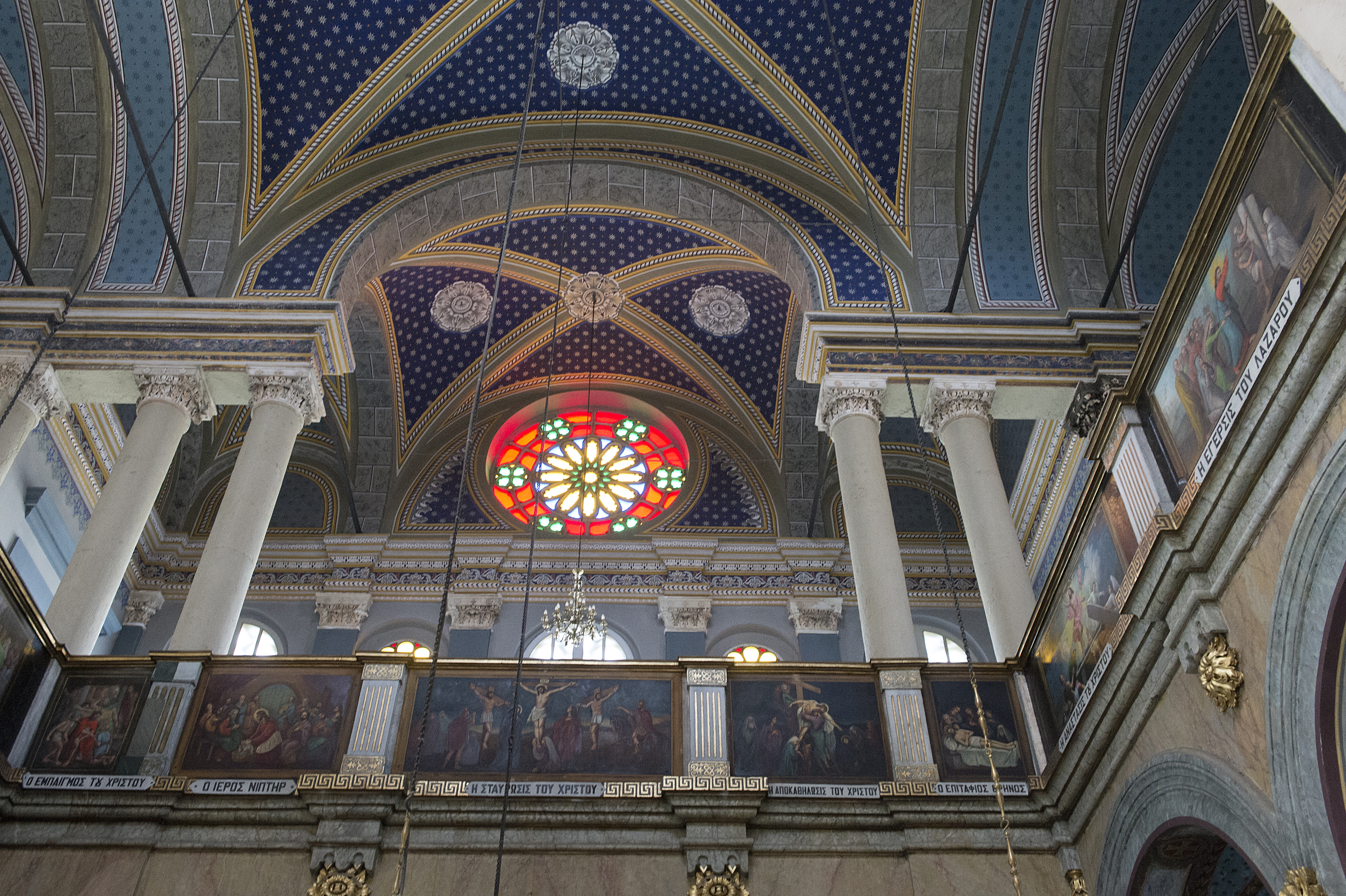
Hagia Triada Greek Orthodox Church balcony7

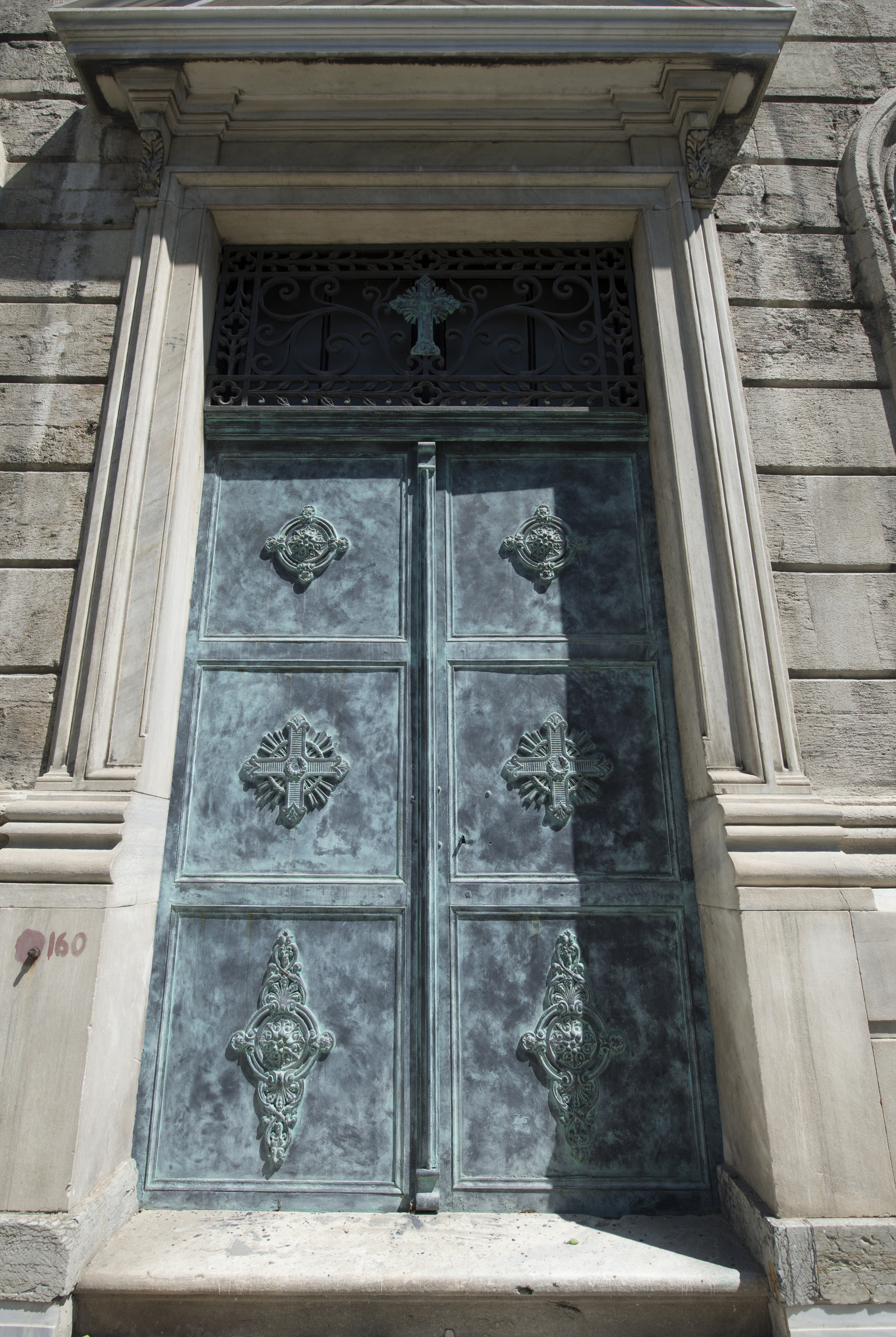
The door of the church

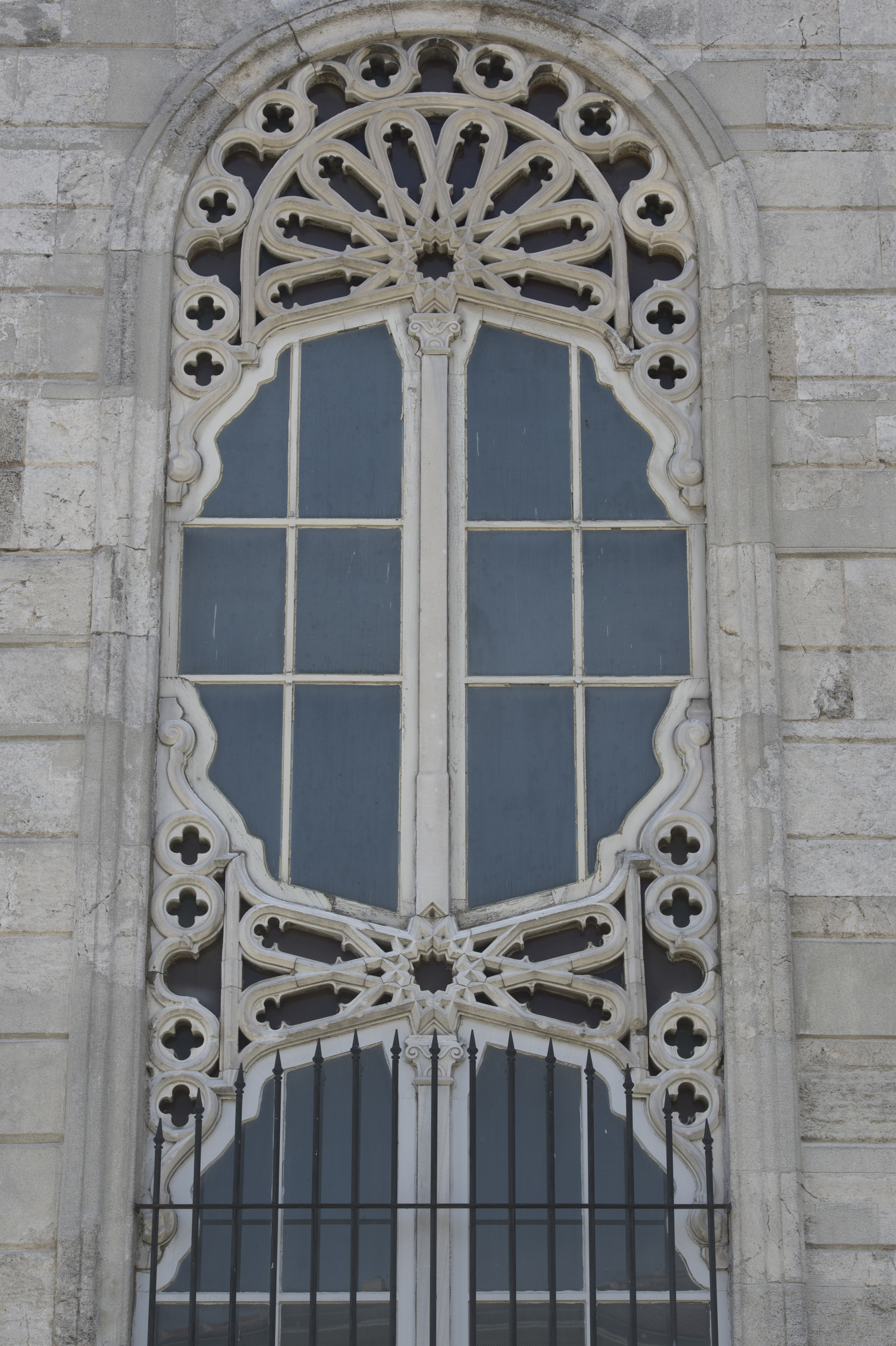
Details of the windows

== See also ==
- Aya Triada Greek Orthodox Church, 360 Degree Virtual Tours (Internal and External) All Areas
- Photo gallery of the church
- Christianity in Turkey
- Greeks in Turkey
- Church of St. Anthony of Padua, Istanbul
- Taksim Square Mosque
- Cyril VII of Constantinople
- Constantine V of Constantinople
