= Shahsavari =

Shahsavari (Persian: شهسواري) may refer to:

- Shahsavari, East Azerbaijan
- Shahsavari, Kohgiluyeh and Boyer-Ahmad

== See also ==
- Shahsavar (disambiguation)
