= Şehsuvar Kadın =

Şehsuvar Kadın may refer to two Imperial consorts:

- Şehsuvar Kadın - consort of Ottoman Sultan Mustafa II and mother of Sultan Osman III.
- Şehsuvar Kadın - consort of Ottoman Caliph Abdülmejid II.
