= Şehsuvar =

Şehsuvar may refer to:

People

- Shah Suwar (before 1432 – 1472), Beg of Dulkadir from 1466 to 1472
- Şehsuvar Sultan (1682 – 27 April 1756), a concubine of the Ottoman Sultan Mustafa II (r. 1695–1703) and Valide Sultan to their son Osman III (r. 1754–1757).
- Şehsuvar Hanım (1881 – 1945), first consort of Ottoman caliph Abdülmejid II and mother of his firstborn and only son, Şehzade Ömer Faruk.

Buildings

- Şehsuvar Bey Mosque

== See also ==
- Şehsuvar, Elâzığ
- Shahsuvar (disambiguation)
