= Shahsavar =

Shahsavar (Persian: شهسوار) may refer to:

- Shahsavar, Chaharmahal and Bakhtiari, village in Lordegan County, Chaharmahal and Bakhtiari Province, Iran
- Shahsavar, East Azerbaijan, village in Heris County, East Azerbaijan Province, Iran
- Shahsavar, Khuzestan, village in Behbahan County, Khuzestan Province, Iran
- Shahsavar, Kurdistan, village in Marivan County, Kurdistan Province, Iran
- Shahsavar, Markazi, village in Arak County, Markazi Province, Iran
- Shahsavar or Tonekabon, capital city of Tonekabon County, Mazandaran Province, Iran
- Shah Suwar (died 1472), Beg of Dulkadir from 1466 to 1472

== See also ==
- Shahsavari (disambiguation)
