= Shahsuvar =

Shahsuvar may refer to:

- Shahsavari, East Azerbaijan

== See also ==
- Shahsavar (disambiguation)
- Şehsuvar (disambiguation)
