= Emetullah Sultan =

Ottoman princess, daughter of Sultan Mustafa II

- Born: 22 June 1701; Edirne Palace, Edirne, Ottoman Empire
- Died: 19 April 1727 (aged 25); Constantinople, Ottoman Empire
- Burial: New Mosque, Istanbul
- Spouse: Osman Pasha (m. 1720; died 1724)
- Issue: Hibetullah Hanımsultan
- Dynasty: Ottoman
- Father: Mustafa II
- Mother: Şehsuvar Sultan
- Religion: Sunni Islam

Emetullah Sultan (Ottoman Turkish: امت الله سلطان; 22 June 1701 – 19 April 1727) was an Ottoman princess, daughter of Sultan Mustafa II and Şehsuvar Sultan, half-sister of Sultan Mahmud I and full-sister of Sultan Osman III.

== Life ==
Emetullah Sultan was born on 22 June 1701 in the Edirne Palace. Her father was the Ottoman Sultan Mustafa II, her mother one of his consorts, Şehsuvar Kadın. She had an older full brother, the future Osman III. She was named after her paternal grandmother, Emetullah Rabia Gülnuş Sultan.

After her father's deposition in 1703 when she was two years old, she settled in the Old Palace in Istanbul.

In 1720, her uncle Sultan Ahmed III arranged her marriage to Osman Pasha. Known by at least four different nicknames—Silâhdâr, Çerkes, Küçük, Sinek—Osman Pasha had risen from serving as a sword-bearer to her father, and had been previously married to her recently deceased cousin Rukiye Hanımsultan, a daughter of Fatma Emetullah Sultan, who in turn was a daughter of Sultan Mehmed IV and so a sister of her father. The marriage took place on 13 September 1720 in the Old Palace.

The two together had a daughter, Hibetullah Hanımsultan. Emetullah was widowed at Osman Pasha's death in 1724.

== Death ==
Emetullah Sultan died on 19 April 1727 at the age of twenty five, and was buried in the mausoleum of New Mosque, Istanbul.

== Issue ==
By her marriage, Emetullah Sultan had a daughter:

- Hibetullah Hanımsultan (c. 1721 – c. 1744). She married Hacı Ali Pasha and had issue. There are her descendants still alive in XXI century.

== See also ==
- List of Ottoman princesses

== Ancestry ==
Ancestors of Emetullah Sultan

8. Ibrahim
4. Mehmed IV
9. Turhan Sultan
2. Mustafa II
5. Gülnuş Sultan
1. Emetullah Sultan
3. Şehsuvar Sultan

== Sources ==
- Uluçay, Mustafa Çağatay (2011). Padişahların kadınları ve kızları. Ankara, Ötüken.
- Duindam, Jeroen; Artan, Tülay; Kunt, Metin (August 11, 2011). Royal Courts in Dynastic States and Empires: A Global Perspective. BRILL. ISBN 978-9-004-20622-9.
- Sakaoğlu, Necdet (2008). Bu mülkün kadın sultanları: Vâlide sultanlar, hâtunlar, hasekiler, kadınefendiler, sultanefendiler. Oğlak Yayıncılık. ISBN 978-9-753-29623-6.
