= Shahsavar, Kurdistan =

Shahsavar شهسوار
- Village
- Location within Iran
- Coordinates: 35°40′02″N 46°19′29″E
- Country: Iran
- Province: Kurdistan
- County: Marivan
- Bakhsh: Sarshiv
- Rural District: Sarshiv

Population (2006)
  - Total: 129
- Time zone: UTC+3:30 (IRST)
  - Summer (DST): UTC+4:30 (IRDT)

Shahsavar (Persian: شهسوار, also Romanized as Shahsavār) is a village in Sarshiv Rural District, Sarshiv District, Marivan County, Kurdistan Province, Iran. At the 2006 census, its population was 129, in 25 families. The village is populated by Kurds.
