= Shahsavar, Chaharmahal and Bakhtiari =

Shahsavar شهسوار
- Village
- Location within Iran
- Coordinates: 31°37′40″N 50°30′43″E
- Country: Iran
- Province: Chaharmahal and Bakhtiari
- County: Lordegan
- Bakhsh: Manj
- Rural District: Manj

Population (2006)
  - Total: 71
- Time zone: UTC+3:30 (IRST)
  - Summer (DST): UTC+4:30 (IRDT)

Shahsavar (Persian: شهسوار, also Romanized as Shahsavār) is a village in Manj Rural District, Manj District, Lordegan County, Chaharmahal and Bakhtiari Province, Iran. At the 2006 census, its population was 71, in 16 families. The village is populated by Lurs.
