= Shahsavari, Kohgiluyeh and Boyer-Ahmad =

Shahsavari شهسواري
- Village
- Location within Iran
- Coordinates: 31°16′22″N 50°20′14″E
- Country: Iran
- Province: Kohgiluyeh and Boyer-Ahmad
- County: Kohgiluyeh
- Bakhsh: Dishmok
- Rural District: Bahmayi-ye Sarhadi-ye Gharbi

Population (2006)
  - Total: 160
- Time zone: UTC+3:30 (IRST)
  - Summer (DST): UTC+4:30 (IRDT)

Shahsavari (Persian: شهسواري, also Romanized as Shahsavārī) is a village in Bahmayi-ye Sarhadi-ye Gharbi Rural District, Dishmok District, Kohgiluyeh County, Kohgiluyeh and Boyer-Ahmad Province, Iran. According to the 2006 census, it had a population of 160, in 26 families.
