= Şehsuvar Sultan =

Valide Sultan of the Ottoman Empire from 1754 to 1756

- Valide sultan

Valide sultan of the Ottoman Empire
- Tenure: 13 December 1754 – 27 April 1756
- Predecessor: Saliha Sultan
- Successor: Mihrişah Sultan
- Born: c. 1682
- Died: 27 April 1756 (aged 73–74); Topkapı Palace, Constantinople, Ottoman Empire (modern-day Istanbul, Turkey)
- Burial: Nuruosmaniye Mosque, Istanbul, Turkey
- Consort: Mustafa II
- Issue: Osman III; Emetullah Sultan
Names
- Turkish: Şehsuvar Sultan; Ottoman Turkish: شھسوار سلطان
- Religion: Sunni Islam

Şehsuvar Sultan (Ottoman Turkish: شهسوار سلطان; c. 1682 – 27 April 1756) was a consort to the Ottoman Sultan Mustafa II (r. 1695–1703) and Valide sultan to their son Osman III (r. 1754–1757).

== Life ==
She is said to have been of Ukrainian or Russian origin, but neither claim has been proven. Most historians agree that her origins remain unknown.

She became a slave concubine of Sultan Mustafa. Şehsuvar and Mustafa had one son, Şehzade Osman (future Osman III), born on 2 January 1699, in the Edirne Palace, and one daughter, Emetullah Sultan. In 1702, Mustafa II gave her two bracelets with rubies and diamonds.

The Edirne event saw Mustafa dethroned, with his brother Ahmed III succeeding as the new Sultan (r. 1703–1730), and Şehsuvar was sent to the Old Palace, Istanbul. Meanwhile, her son, Şehzade Osman was transferred to the Topkapı Palace in Istanbul together with the entire court.

Sultan Mahmud I, Mustafa's first son and the older half-brother of Osman, succeeded as Sultan following Patrona Halil's orchestrated riot. Mahmud was then succeeded by his half-brother Osman, thus Şehsuvar became the new Valide sultan.

Valide sultans were usually transported to Topkapı Palace by carriages. However, Şehsuvar was brought to the palace in a palanquin. The sultan, who had not seen his mother for many years, ordered his sword girding ceremony to be held a few days after his mother's arrival at the palace.

In 1755, Şehsuvar persuaded her son not to execute the grand vizier, Hekimoğlu Ali Pasha, who had been imprisoned in the Kız Kulesi. This proved to be an example of beneficent influence.

== Death ==
Şehsuvar Sultan died on 27 April 1756 in the Topkapı Palace, and was buried in a separate mausoleum located at the Nuruosmaniye Mosque, Çemberlitaş, Fatih, Istanbul.

== Issue ==
Together with Mustafa, Şehsuvar had one son and a daughter:

- Osman III (Edirne Palace, Edirne, 2 January 1699 – Istanbul, Turkey, 30 October 1757, buried in Tomb of Turhan Sultan, New Mosque, Istanbul). 25th Sultan of the Ottoman Empire.
- Emetullah Sultan (1701 – 19 April 1727). She married once and had a daughter.

== See also ==
- List of Valide Sultans
- List of consorts of the Ottoman Sultans

== Sources ==
- Sakaoğlu, Necdet (2008). Bu mülkün kadın sultanları: Vâlide sultanlar, hâtunlar, hasekiler, kadınefendiler, sultanefendiler. Oğlak Yayıncılık. ISBN 978-9-753-29623-6.
- Uluçay, Mustafa Çağatay (2011). Padişahların kadınları ve kızları. Ankara, Ötüken.

Ottoman royalty
| Preceded by Saliha Sultan | Valide Sultan; 13 December 1754 – 27 April 1756 | Succeeded by Mihrişah Sultan |
