= Osman III =

Sultan of the Ottoman Empire from 1754 to 1757

- Custodian of the Two Holy Mosques
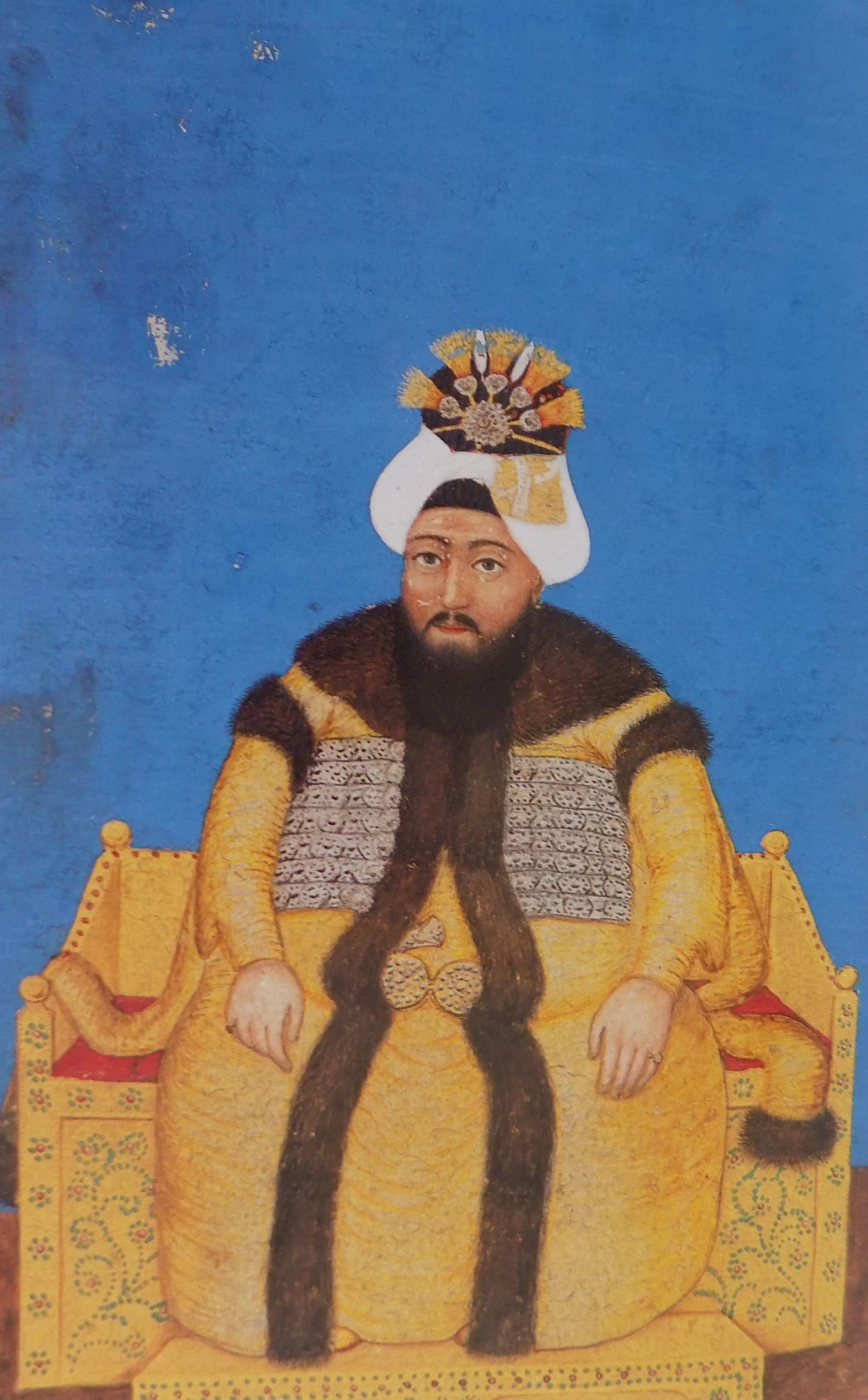
- Portrait by Rapayel Manas

Sultan of the Ottoman Empire (Padishah)
- Reign: 13 December 1754 – 30 October 1757
- Predecessor: Mahmud I
- Successor: Mustafa III

Ottoman Caliph (Amir al-Mu'minin)
- Predecessor: Mahmud I
- Successor: Mustafa III
- Born: 2 January 1699; Edirne Palace, Edirne, Ottoman Empire
- Died: 30 October 1757 (aged 58); Topkapı Palace, Constantinople, Ottoman Empire
- Burial: Tomb of Turhan Sultan, New Mosque, Istanbul
- Consorts: Leyla Kadın; Fülane Kadın; Zevki Kadın; Emine Ferhunde Kadın
Names
- Osman bin Mustafa
- Dynasty: Ottoman
- Father: Mustafa II
- Mother: Şehsuvar Sultan
- Religion: Sunni Islam
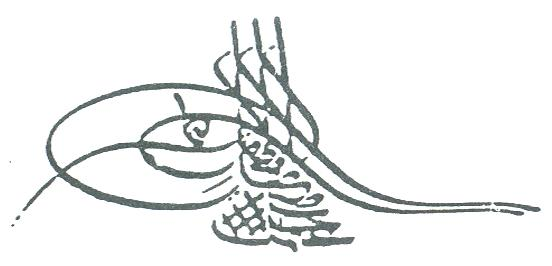
- Tughra

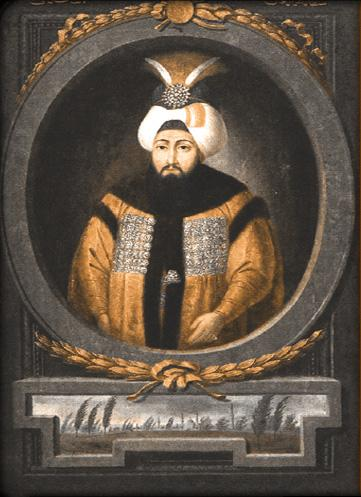
Sultan Osman III by Konstantin Kapıdağlı

Osman III (Ottoman Turkish: عثمان ثالث Osmān-i sālis; 2 January 1699 – 30 October 1757) was the sultan of the Ottoman Empire from 1754 to 1757. He was succeeded by his cousin Mustafa III.

== Early life ==
Osman III was born on 2 January 1699 in the Edirne Palace. His father was Mustafa II and his mother was Şehsuvar Sultan. He was the younger half-brother of Mahmud I. When his father was deposed from the throne in 1703, he was taken back to Istanbul and imprisoned in the Kafes. Osman III lived in the Kafes for 51 years.

He was secretly circumcised on 17 April 1705 with the other princes here. He was among the princes in Ahmed's entourage. He also later made trips to the sultan inside and outside the city. Together with his elder brother Mahmud's embassy on 1 October 1730, he became the eldest prince waiting for the throne.

== Reign ==
Osman III lived most of his life as a prisoner in the palace, and as a consequence, he had some behavioural peculiarities when he took the throne. Unlike previous sultans, he hated music, and banished all musicians from the palace. According to Baron de Tott, Osman III was an angry and a modest type of ruler.

Osman III's initial action in governance was to select officials to collaborate with. Throughout his reign, the alterations he implemented in high-level governmental positions, particularly that of the Grand Vizier, can be seen as efforts to diminish the overwhelming influence of the charitable authority prevalent during the previous sultan's era.

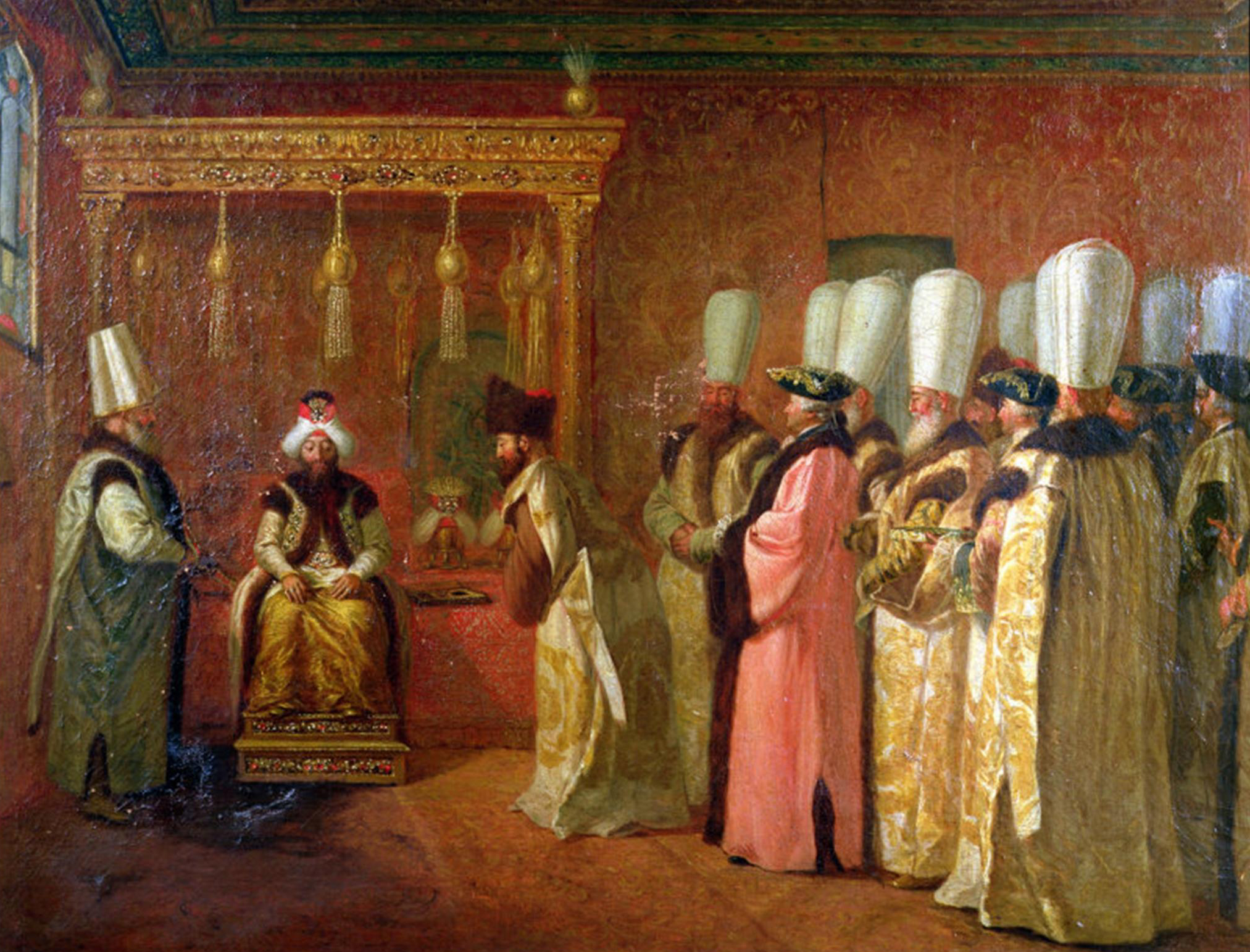
Audience of French ambassador Charles de Vergennes with Sultan Osman III in 1755.

In the severe storm of March 1756, an Egyptian galleon ran ashore in Kumkapı at dusk. Due to the storm, 600 passengers could not be evacuated. The sultan, who came to the shore, took all the passengers by bringing barges from the shipyard. He ordered the construction of the Ahırkapı Lighthouse in Istanbul to prevent such incidents.

The first procession of his enthronement was held on 14 December 1754. Contemporary historians stopped writing on political events due to the severe and freezing cold of January 1755. Osman was responsible for a firman in 1757 that established the Status Quo of various sites for Christians, Muslims, and Jews in the Holy Land.

In the second year of his reign, Osman lost his mother Şehsuvar Sultan, afterward, the oldest prince Mehmed, died of illness on 22 December 1756. According to various sources, the funeral of the prince, controlled by the grand vizier and the sheikh al-Islam. It was attended by 5,000 people and contemporary sources mentioned that the prince was poisoned and killed on the initiative of Köse Mustafa Pasha.

The sultan was notified of provisions sent to oppose banditry in Anatolia and Rumelia. Measures were taken against the tribes of Bozulus and Cihanbeyli, the Armenians (due to the turmoil in Iran), the bandits around Erzurum and Sivas, and the famous leader Karaosmanoğlu Hacı Mustafa Ağa. The latter was captured and executed, and his head was brought to Istanbul on 5 December 1755.

=== Architecture ===
Osman is famous for building the Nuruosmaniye Mosque, whose construction started during the reign of Mahmud I. Nuruosmaniye Complex, also known as Osmaniye for a while, consisted of three schools, madrasahs, a factory, a library, a mausoleum, a temporary room, a mesh house, a fountain, an inn, and shops. Osman built a new neighborhood in 1755-56 where Üsküdar Palace and Garden was located, along with houses and shops. He also built the Ihsaniye Mosque and its masajid ( plural of masjid ), both of which stand today as İhsaniye.

Osman III built a fountain in his name in 1755–56; it was destroyed 122 years after its construction.

== Death ==
Osman III died on the night of 30 October 1757. In the early morning, a ceremony was held and his cousin Mustafa III was placed on the throne. The new sultan ordered Osman to be buried in the New Mosque Mausoleum, not in Nuruosmaniye.

== Family ==
Osman III had four known consorts but no children, as did his elder half-brother Mahmud I. Sakaoğlu, a Turkish historian, speculates that the two may have suffered castration while imprisoned in the Kafes, but other historians point out that Osman III was 55 at the time of his rise and, unlike his brother, who had a long reign, he was on the throne for only three years before he died, and that both of these factors may have influenced the fact of not having children.

The known consorts of Osman III are:

- Leyla Kadın. BaşKadin (First Consort) of Osman throughout his reign. In 1757, a few months after Osman's death, she was married to Hacı Mehmed Emin Bey (d. 16 July 1785) with whom she had a son, Feyzullah Bey (d. 12 August 1792). She died in 1794 and was buried in Üsküdar.
- Fülane Kadın. Second Kadın. No information about her is known except her rank.
- Zevki Kadın. Third Kadın. She sponsored several building renovations and built a fountain in Fındıklı, in the Turkish-Baroque style.
- Emine Ferhunde Kadın. Fourth Kadin. She died in August 1791.

== Sources ==
- Haskan, Mehmet Nermi (2001). Yüzyıllar boyunca Üsküdar – Volume 3. Üsküdar Belediyesi. p. 1332. ISBN 978-9-759-76063-2.
- Sakaoğlu, Necdet (2015). Bu Mülkün Sultanları. Alfa Yayıncılık. ISBN 978-6-051-71080-8.

Osman III House of Osman Born: 2 January 1699 Died: 30 October 1757[aged 58]
Regnal titles
Preceded by Mahmud I	Sultan of the Ottoman Empire; 13 Dec 1754 – 30 Oct 1757	Succeeded by Mustafa III
Sunni Islam titles
Preceded by Mahmud I	Caliph of the Ottoman Caliphate; 13 Dec 1754 – 30 Oct 1757	Succeeded by Mustafa III
