= Shahsavari, East Azerbaijan =

Shahsavari شهسواري
- Village
- Location within Iran
- Coordinates: 38°18′22″N 46°48′21″E
- Country: Iran
- Province: East Azerbaijan
- County: Heris
- Bakhsh: Khvajeh
- Rural District: Bedevostan-e Gharbi

Population (2006)
  - Total: 467
- Time zone: UTC+3:30 (IRST)
  - Summer (DST): UTC+4:30 (IRDT)

Shahsavari (Persian: شهسواري, also Romanized as Shahsavārī; also known as Shahsavār, Shāhsuvār, and Shakhsuvar) is a village in Bedevostan-e Gharbi Rural District, Khvajeh District, Heris County, East Azerbaijan Province, Iran. At the 2006 census, its population was 467, in 106 families.
