= Victory column =

Monument in the form of a column

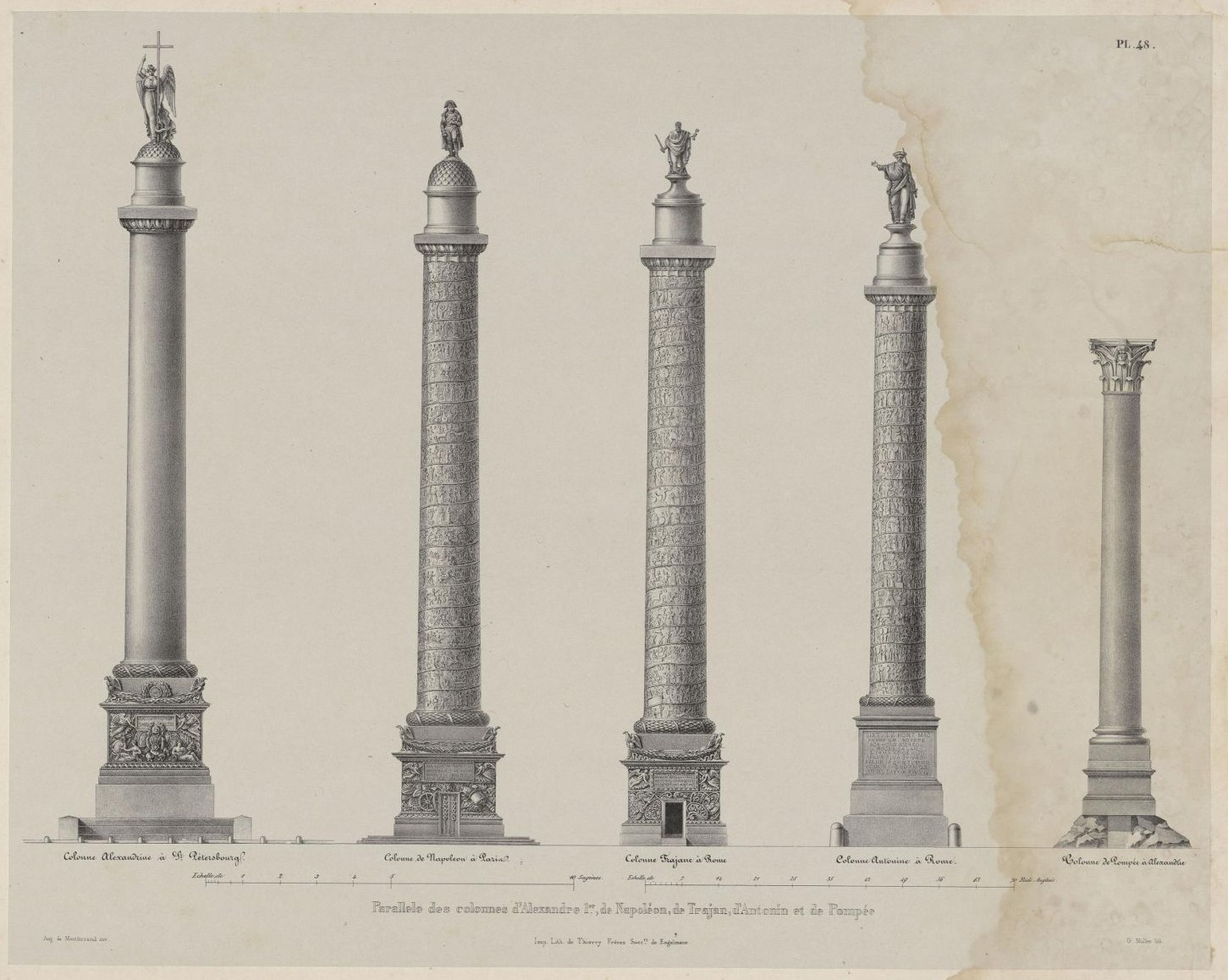
19th-century comparison between the Alexander Column, the Column of the Grande Armée, Trajan's Column, the Column of Marcus Aurelius, and "Pompey's Pillar"

A victory column, or monumental column or triumphal column, is a monument in the form of a column, erected in memory of a heroic commemoration, including victorious battle, war, or revolution. The column typically stands on a base and is crowned with a victory symbol, such as a statue. The statue may represent the goddess Victoria; in Germany, the female embodiment of the nation, Germania; in the United States either the female embodiment of the nation Columbia or Liberty; in the United Kingdom, the female embodiment Britannia, an eagle, or a naval war hero depicted as a helmeted woman, wielding a trident, shield and olive branch.

== Monumental columns ==
Image	Date	Monument	Country	City	Location	Coordinates	Height above ground	Comment
	478 BC	Serpent Column	Turkey	Istanbul	Hippodrome of Constantinople	41.005651 N 28.975113 E	8 m	Originally part of a tripod at Delphi
	115 BC	Heliodorus Pillar	India	Vidisha	Madhya Pradesh, Central India	23.549508 N 77.800093 E		Erected around 113 BCE in central India in Vidisha (then known as Besnagar), by Heliodorus, a Greek ambassador of the Indo-Greek king Antialcidas the court of the Shunga king Bhagabhadra
	c. 65	Jupiter Column	Germany	Mainz	Landesmuseum Mainz	50.005336 N 8.270532 E	12.5 m	Replica displayed in front of the Landtag
Trajan's Column in Trajan's Forum	113	Trajan's Column	Italy	Rome	Trajan's Forum	41.895836 N 12.484276 E	35.07 m	Internal spiral staircase, external helical frieze of reliefs. Tomb of the honorand, Trajan. Archetype of victory column.
The extant base of the Column of Antoninus Pius	161	Column of Antoninus Pius	Italy	Rome	Campus Martius	41.901598 N 12.476285 E	14.75 m	Monolithic granite column shaft, c. 14.8 m. Only the base now survives.
The Column of Marcus Aurelius in Piazza Colonna	Before 193	Column of Marcus Aurelius	Italy	Rome	Piazza Colonna	41.900855 N 12.479987 E	39.72 m	Internal spiral staircase, external helical frieze of reliefs. Directly modelled on Trajan's Column
	c. 200	Column at the end of the Via Appia	Italy	Brindisi	Near the port	40.641071 N 17.946787 E	18.74 m	
The Column of the Goths in Gülhane Park	Between 268 and 337	Column of the Goths	Turkey	Istanbul	Gülhane Park	41.014515 N 28.985470 E	18.5 m	
Pompey's Pillar	298–302	Pompey's Pillar	Egypt	Alexandria	Serapeum of Alexandria	31.182512 N 29.896426 E	26.85 m	Entirely unconnected with Pompey. Dedicated to Diocletian by Aelius Publius, the governor of Aegyptus, between 298 and 302. Monolithic granite column shaft, 20.75 m. Corinthian capital. Originally topped with a statue of the augustus in porphyry, c. 7 m. Possibly accompanied by smaller columns honouring of Diocletian's co-emperors.
	11 May 330	Column of Constantine	Turkey	Istanbul	Forum of Constantine, Çemberlitaş, Fatih	41.008530 N 28.971270 E	35 m	Upper portion of the column has not survived.
Column of Phocas in the Foro Romano	330–400	Column of Phocas	Italy	Rome	Roman Forum	41.892474 N 12.484854 E	13.6 m	Column originally fourth century, Constantinian dynasty or after; imitating the Column and Forum of Constantine in Constantinople. Monolithic fluted marble column shaft. Corinthian capital. Rededicated to Phocas by Smaragdus, the Exarch of Italy, in 608 with an inscription and gilded statue of that augustus; last addition to the Forum Romanum.
	386–393/'4	Column of Theodosius	Turkey	Istanbul	Forum of Theodosius, Fatih		c. 50 m	Largest Roman column monument. Internal spiral staircase, external helical frieze of reliefs. Originally topped in 393/'4 with a statue of Theodosius I in bronze. The statue fell in an earthquake in 480. Rededicated to Anastasius I in 506 with a new bronze statue. Demolished 16th century; precise site in Theodoisus's Forum unknown.
	c. 400	Iron pillar of Delhi	India	Delhi	Qutb Complex	28.524718 N 77.185014 E	7.12 m	It was transferred from Udayagiri or Vidisha to Delhi in the 11th century by Iltutmish the Sultan of Delhi. It was originally erected by the Chandragupta II of the Gupta empire.
Column of Arcadius in the Forum of Arcadius	401–421	Column of Arcadius	Turkey	Istanbul	Forum of Arcadius, Fatih	41.007736 N 28.943071 E	c. 46.1 m	Internal spiral staircase, external helical frieze of reliefs. 21 monolithic column drums. Doric capital. Originally topped with a statue of Arcadius, c. 8.5 m, similar to the statue on the Column of Theodosius. The statue fell in an earthquake in 740. Demolished 1719; only the base, c. 10.5 m, survives.
The Column of Marcian in 2007	450–452	Column of Marcian	Turkey	Istanbul	Forum of Marcian, Fatih	41.015410 N 28.950292 E	c. 16.5 m (present)	Dedicated to Marcian by Tatianus, prefect of Constantinople between 450 and 452. Monolithic granite column shaft, 8.74 m. Corinthian capital. Originally topped with a statue of the augustus, referred to in the inscription and lost at an unknown date.
Column drum from the Column of Leo in 2007	457–474	Column of Leo	Turkey	Istanbul	Forum of Leo Fatih	41.013313 N 28.984836 E	21–26 m	Built in the reign of Leo I. Eight marble column drums, decorated with wreaths. Corinthian capital. Originally topped with a statue of the augustus. Destroyed before the 1540s; fragments remain in the grounds of the Topkapı Palace. The imperial statue on top may survive in Italy as the Colossus of Barletta.
Reconstruction of the column, after Cornelius Gurlitt, 1912. The depiction of a helical narrative frieze around the column, after the fashion of Trajan's Column, is erroneous.	543	Column of Justinian	Turkey	Istanbul	Augustaeum, Fatih			Masonry column shaft decorated with wreaths next to Hagia Sophia. Colossal equestrian statue in bronze reused from a Theodosian monument. c. 7 m statue. Column's bronze sheath removed after the Fourth Crusade's 1204 Sack of Constantinople. Statue removed soon after 1453 Fall of Constantinople. Toppled by Ottomans in 1515. Socle and statue destroyed in 1529.
	595	Mahakuta Pillar	India	Mahakuta		15.932953 N 75.722656 E		
	c. 850	Pillar of Eliseg	United Kingdom		Near Valle Crucis Abbey	52.992123 N 3.189321 W		
	983	Tyagada Brahmadeva Pillar	India	Shravanabelagola			2.3 m	
	c. 1000	Bernward Column	Germany	Hildesheim	Hildesheim Cathedral	52.148929 N 9.947179 E	3.79 m	
	c. 1190	Qutb Minar	India	Delhi	Qutb Complex	28.524387 N 77.185518 E	73 m	The Qutb Minar, also spelled as Qutub Minar and Qutab Minar, is a minaret and "victory tower" that forms part of the Qutb complex. It is usually thought that the tower is named for Qutb-ud-din Aibak, who began construction of the Minar.
	11th century	Heunensäule	Germany	Mainz	Markt	49.999550 N 8.273614 E	6.4 m	
	after 1244	Colonna di Santa Felicita	Italy	Florence	In front of Santa Felicita	43.767114 N 11.252293 E		
	1268	Columns of San Marco and San Todaro	Italy	Venice	Piazza San Marco	45.433289 N 12.339657 E		
	Before 1333	Colonna di San Zanobi	Italy	Florence	Piazza San Giovanni	43.773378 N 11.254912 E		
	1338	Colonna della Croce al Trebbio	Italy	Florence		43.773132 N 11.250434 E		
	1431	Colonna dell'Abbondanza	Italy	Florence	Piazza della Repubblica	43.771579 N 11.254314 E		
	1 March 1467		Italy	Siena	Viale Vittorio Emanuele II	43.3286349 N 11.3224004 E		
	1448	Vijaya Stambha	India	Chittor	Chittor Fort	24.887884 N 74.645171 E	37.19m	The tower was constructed by the Mewar king, Rana Kumbha, in 1448 to commemorate his victory over the combined armies of Malwa and Gujarat led by Mahmud Khilji. The tower is dedicated to Hindu god Vishnu.
	1548?	Pestsäule	Germany	Eching am Ammersee		48.079032 N 11.112875 E	2 m	
	1565	Colonna della Giustizia	Italy	Florence	Piazza Santa Trinita	43.770126 N 11.251267 E		Spolia from the 3rd century AD Baths of Caracalla in Rome
	1572	Colonna di San Felice	Italy	Florence	In front of San Felice	43.765163 N 11.248104 E		
	1572	Colonna di San Marco	Italy	Florence	In front of San Marco	43.778768 N 11.259366 E	12.9 m	
	1574	Alameda Hércules column. Roman columns with statues of Hercules (inspired by the Farnese Hercules) and Julius Caesar	Spain	Seville	In front of La Alameda, Seville	37.400246 N 5.993597 W	10 m	
	1574	Medici column	France	Paris	In front of Paris Bourse	48.862525 N 2.342993 E	28 m	
	1614	Column of Peace	Italy	Rome	Piazza dell'Esquilino, in front of Santa Maria Maggiore	41.897038 N 12.499385 E	42 m	Spolia from the 4th century AD Basilica of Maxentius
	1627	Colonna di San Domenico	Italy	Bologna	San Domenico	44.489900 N 11.343722 E		
	31 May 1628	Column of Infamy	Italy	Genoa	Piazza Vacchero	44.412562 N 8.928214 E		
	1628	Colonna dell'Immacolata	Italy	Bologna		44.494342 N 11.336446 E		
	7 November 1638	Mariensäule	Germany	Munich	Marienplatz	48.137232 N 11.575510 E	14 m	
	1644	Sigismund's Column	Poland	Warsaw	Castle Square	52.247260 N 21.013375 E	22 m	
	1647	Mariensäule	Austria	Wernstein am Inn		48.505547 N 13.454414 E	17 m	Transferred from original site in Vienna in 1667.
	1650	Mary Column	Czechia	Prague	Old Town Square		16 m	Destroyed in 1918
	1651	Pestsäule	Germany	Fulda		50.559691 N 9.671735 E	15 m	
	1654	Victory Column	Germany	Kronach		50.240462 N 11.324268 E		
	1656	Countess Pillar	United Kingdom	Near Brougham	54.653682 N 2.704906 W			
	1666	Colonna di Sant'Oronzo	Italy	Lecce		40.352927 N 18.172767 E		Originally one of the columns at the end of the Via Appia in Brindisi
	1673	Verziere Column	Italy	Milan	Verziere	45.463150 N 9.197222 E		
	1674	Mariensäule	Germany	Freising	Marienplatz	48.400841 N 11.744036 E	15 m	
	1675	Monument to Ludovico Ariosto	Italy	Ferrara	Piazza Ariostea	44.841359 N 11.626514 E		
	1677	The Monument	United Kingdom	London	Corner of Monument Street and Fish Street Hill	51.510157 N 0.085947 W	62 m	
	1679	Beschornerkreuz	Austria	Vienna	Favoritenstraße	48.167107 N 16.381275 E		Badly damaged in World War II and replaced in 1979.
	1680	Dreifaltigkeitssäule	Austria	Klagenfurt am Wörthersee	In front of the Church of the Holy Spirit	46.625283 N 14.307690 E		
	1681	Column of the Blessed Virgin Mary	Poland	Kłodzko		50.438680 N 16.654002 E	11.5 m	
	1683	Dreifaltigkeitssäule	Austria	Vienna	Landstraße	48.211383 N 16.385724 E		
	1693	Pestsäule	Austria	Vienna	Graben	48.208719 N 16.369807 E		
	1694	Kolumna Maryjna	Poland	Prudnik	Town Square	50.321899 N 17.580060 E		
	1698	Kolumna Maryjna	Poland	Międzylesie		50.321899 N 17.580058 E		
	26 July 1706	St Anna's Column	Austria	Innsbruck	Maria-Theresien-Straße	47.265679 N 11.394209 E		
	1711	Mariensäule	Germany	Duderstadt	Gropenmarkt	51.512342 N 10.261748 E	12.15 m	
	1714	Austria	Pestsäule	Mödling		48.085981 N 16.284512 E		
	1715	Column of the Virgin Mary Immaculate	Poland	Kutná Hora	Šultysova street	49.949416 N 15.266857 E		
	1715?	Dreifaltigkeitssäule	Austria	Poysdorf		48.667918 N 16.629299 E		
	2 December 1717	Mariensäule	Germany	Ochsenhausen	Ochsenhausen Abbey	48.064497 N 9.949413 E	8.3 m	
		Blenheim Column of Victory	United Kingdom		Blenheim Palace	51.849888 N 1.369576 W	41 m	
	1723	Dreifaltigkeitssäule	Austria	Linz	Hauptplatz	48.305861 N 14.286432 E	20 m	
	1723	Immaculata	Slovakia	Košice	Hlavná ulica	48.722838 N 21.256810 E	14 m	
	1724	Pestsäule	Austria	Bleiburg		46.590166 N 14.798726 E		
	1727	Kolumna Maryjna	Poland	Racibórz	Town Square	50.092009 N 18.219817 E	14 m	
	1728	Colonna dell'Immacolata	Italy	Palermo	Piazza San Domenico	38.118739 N 13.362882 E		
	23 November 1730	Coloana Ciumei	Romania	Timișoara	Piața Unirii	45.757950 N 21.229082 E		
	1732	Mariensäule	Germany	Aub	Marktplatz	49.552507 N 10.065376 E		
	1739	Statue of St Nepomuk and Mary	Romania	Timișoara	Piața Libertății	45.755766 N 21.227206 E		
	9 March 1742	Pomnik Trójcy Świętej	Poland	Lądku-Zdroju		50.345854 N 16.871856 E	7 m	
	After 1746	Kolumna Trójcy Świętej	Poland	Bystrzyca Kłodzka		50.296831 N 16.651757 E	10 m	
	1749	The Grenville Column	United Kingdom		Stowe House	52.030677 N 1.014969 W		
	1754	Holy Trinity Column in Olomouc	Czechia	Olomouc		49.593935 N 17.250445 E	35 m	
	1767	Burton Pynsent Monument	United Kingdom	Curry Rivel	Troy Hill	51.022421 N 2.889986 W	43 m	
	1770	Eagle Column	Russia	Gatchina		59.566958 N 30.095930 E	6.4 m	
	1778	Germany	Mariensäule	Nordheim am Main		49.859600 N 10.182864 E		
	1778	Chesme Column	Russia	Tsarskoye Selo	Catharine Palace	59.710054 N 30.393685 E		
	After 1778	Keppel's Column	United Kingdom		Near Wentworth and Kimberworth	53.447944 N 1.415152 W	35 m	
	1780	Mariensäule	Germany	Eichstätt		48.891157 N 11.183213 E	24 m	
	15 August 1802	Monument to the Magdeburg Rights	Ukraine	Kyiv	Podil Raion	50.456003 N 30.529509 E	23 m	
	August 1809	Nelson's Pillar	Ireland	Dublin	O'Connell Street	53.349812 N 6.260257 W	40.8 m	Destroyed in 1966 by Irish Republicans
	1809	Nelson's Column	Canada	Montreal	Place Jacques-Cartier	45.508202 N 73.553866 W	19 m	
	15 August 1810	Colonne Vendôme	France	Paris	Place Vendôme	48.867476 N 2.329450 E	44.3 m	
	1811	Rostral Columns	Russia	Saint Petersburg	Old Saint Petersburg Stock Exchange	59.943094 N 30.306795 E		
	27 June 1811	Glory Monument	Russia	Poltava		49.589575 N 34.551197 E	10.35 m	
	1814	Camphill Column	United Kingdom	Alnwick		55.404882 N 1.715109 W		
	1815	Battle Monument	United States	Baltimore	Battle Monument Square	39.290687 N 76.612412 W	11.88 m	
	1816	Column of the Duchess of Angoulême	France	Angoulême	Avenue Wilson	45.652651 N 0.146832 E		
	1816	Tenantry Column	United Kingdom	Alnwick		55.410898 N 1.699185 W	25 m	
	18 June 1816	Lord Hill's Column	United Kingdom	Shrewsbury	Outside the Shirehall	52.704168 N 2.731822 W	40.7 m	
	1819	Britannia Monument	United Kingdom	Great Yarmouth		52.588479 N 1.733627 E	44 m	
	1821	Column of the Grande Armée	France	Wimille	Rue Napoleon	50.741269 N 1.617428 E	53 m	
	1823	Column of Louis XVI	France	Nantes	Place Maréchal-Foch	47.219519 N 1.549839 W	28 m	
	1823	Column of the Duchess of Angoulême	France	Saint-Florent-le-Vieil		47.363987 N 1.021578 W	15 m	
	4 September 1823	Column of the Pope	France	Nice		43.696307 N 7.262657 E		
	1826	Column of Charles Felix	France	Bonneville		46.075445 N 6.405684 E	21.44 m	
	22 August 1828	Constitution Column	Germany	Volkach		49.897877 N 10.224168 E	32 m	
	6 March 1829	Demidovsky Pillar	Russia	Yaroslavl		57.625015 N 39.897312 E	12 m	Dismantled 1935, rebuilt 2004.
	1829	Washington Monument	United States	Baltimore	Mount Vernon	39.297554 N 76.615670 W	54 m	
	1831	Duke of York Column	United Kingdom	London	Corner of Regent Street and The Mall	51.506342 N 0.131727 W	41.99 m	
	18 June 1832	Waterloo Column	Germany	Hanover	Waterlooplatz	52.366517 N 9.727602 E	46.31 m	
	1833	La Consulaire	France	Brest	Arsenal	48.386071 N 4.495170 W	7 m	Transformed from a captured Barbary cannon.
	30 August 1834	Alexander Column	Russia	Saint Petersburg	Palace Square	59.939018 N 30.315734 E	47.5 m	
	1835	Admiral Hood Monument	United Kingdom	Compton Dundon		51.101358 N 2.721318 W	33.5 m	
	28 July 1840	July Column	France	Paris	Place de la Bastille	48.853169 N 2.369139 E	47 m	
	1843	Berlin Peace Column	Germany	Berlin	Mehringplatz	52.498981 N 13.391776 E	19 m	
	November 1843	Nelson's Column	United Kingdom	London	Trafalgar Square	51.507776 N 0.127911 W	51.6 m	
	25 August 1844	Column of Louis I of Hesse	Germany	Darmstadt	Luisenplatz	49.872852 N 8.651196 E	39.5 m	
	1845	Column of the Goddess	France	Lille	Grand Place	50.636921 N 3.063437 E	15.5 m	
	1845	Monument to the Third Council of Trent	Italy	Trento	North of Santa Maria Maggiore	46.068780 N 11.119453 E		
	1846	Anniversary Column	Germany	Stuttgart	Schlossplatz	48.778585 N 9.179862 E	32.6 m	Concordia statue was put up on top of Jubilee Column in 1863
	22 December 1851	Columna de la Libertad de los Esclavos	Colombia	Ocaña		8.235417 N 73.353872 W		
	15 October 1854 & 1855	Prussia Columns	Germany	Rügen	Neukamp and Groß Stresow	54.318950 N 13.461795 E; 54.356866 N 13.571766 E	15 m	Dismantled for repair in 1991 and never rebuilt.
	1856	Brock's Monument	Canada	Queenston		43.160164 N 79.053044 W	56 m	
	8 December 1857	Column of the Immaculate Conception	Italy	Rome	Piazza di Spagna	41.905003 N 12.482962 E	11.81 m	
	September 1858	Mariensäule	Germany	Cologne		50.942751 N 6.946597 E	13.5 m	
	26 September 1859	Congress Column	Belgium	Brussels	Place du Congrès	50.850115 N 4.363457 E	47 m	
	1861	Westminster Scholars War Memorial	United Kingdom	London	In front of Westminster Abbey	51.499515 N 0.129142 W		
	1865	Wellington's Column	United Kingdom	Liverpool	Corner of William Brown Street and Lime Street	53.409629 N 2.978844 W	40.2 m	
	8 October 1866	Mariensäule	Germany	Trier	Markusberg	49.760305 N 6.619894 E	40 m	
	20 February 1867	Columna de la Paz	Uruguay	Montevideo	Plaza de Cagancha	34.905913 S 56.191363 W	17 m	First monument in the city of Montevideo. Its statue was made of molten cannons from the Uruguayan civil war.
	1868	Polnische Freiheitssäule	Switzerland	Rapperswil	Rapperswil Castle	47.227352 N 8.815227 E		
	1 June 1869	Soldiers' National Monument	United States		Gettysburg Battlefield	39.819793 N 77.231215 W	18 m	
	1870	Vantiano Lighthouse	Italy	Brescia		45.540223 N 10.201846 E	60 m	
	4 July 1870	Civil War Memorial	United States	Adrian	Memorial Park	41.896476 N 84.029312 W		Recycled from the Bank of Pennsylvania
	1873	Mariensäule	Germany	Düsseldorf	Maxplatz	51.222439 N 6.771259 E		
	2 September 1873	Berlin victory column	Germany	Berlin	Großer Stern	52.514554 N 13.350100 E	66.89 m	
	1874	Column of Pedro IV	Portugal	Lisbon	Rossio Square	38.713807 N 9.139362 W	27.5 m	
	4 July 1874	Soldiers and Sailors Monument	United States	Lancaster, Pennsylvania	Penn Square	40.037964 N 76.305703 W	13 m	
	2 December 1874	Victory Column	Germany	Schwerin		53.625653 N 11.416119 E	23 m	
	1876	Oberhausen Victory Column	Germany	Oberhausen	Altmarkt	51.468826 N 6.849969 E		
	1877	Siegburg Victory Column	Germany	Siegburg	Markt	50.797054 N 7.207624 E		
	17 September 1877	Soldiers and Sailors Monument	United States	Boston	Boston Common	42.355470 N 71.066413 W	38 m	
	1878	Oldenburg Peace Column	Germany	Oldenburg	Peace Place	53.141429 N 8.207484 E		
	2 September 1879	Hakenberg Victory Column	Germany	Hakenberg		52.771053 N 12.828941 E	36 m	
	1880	Mariensäule	Germany	Munich	Pasing	48.146763 N 11.459396 E	7.4 m	
	1881	Soldier's Monument	United States	Davenport	College Square Historic District	41.531270 N 90.575540 W	15.25 m	
	4 July 1884	Soldiers and Sailors Monument	United States	Buffalo	Lafayette Square	42.885667 N 78.873834 W	33.7 m	
	10 October 1884	Yorktown Victory Monument	United States	Yorktown	Colonial National Historical Park	37.233416 N 76.504991 W	29.87 m	
	1886	Mariensäule	Germany	Kyllburg		50.043345 N 6.592808 E	15 m	
	1886	Ivar Huitfeldt Column	Denmark	Copenhagen	Langelinie	55.690625 N 12.599159 E		
	1887	Soldiers' and Sailors' Monument	United States	New Haven	East Rock	41.327277 N 72.904666 W	34 m	
	1888	Columbus Monument	Spain	Barcelona	La Rambla	41.375821 N 2.177777 E	60 m	
	24 June 1889	Column of the Plaza Bolivar	Venezuela	Valencia	Plaza Bolívar (Valencia)	10.182815 N 68.003288 W		
	1891	Alexander II Column	Ukraine	Odesa	Shevchenko Park	46.478374 N 30.754748 E	12.6 m	
	4 July 1894	Cuyahoga County Soldiers' and Sailors' Monument	United States	Cleveland	Public Square	41.499535 N 81.692925 W	38 m	
	1894	Column of Alexander II	Ukraine	Rostov-on-Don		47.227747 N 39.749096 E	11 m	
	1896	Angel of Peace	Germany	Munich	Maximilian Park	48.141367 N 11.596993 E	38 m	
	1900	Millenium Monument	Hungary	Budapest	Hősök tere	47.515151 N 19.078157 E	36 m	
	1902	Monument aux Girondins	France	Bordeaux	Place des Quinconces	44.845395 N 0.574875 W	54 m	
	1904	Mariensäule	Germany	Appelhülsen		51.898525 N 7.422997 E	5.4 m	
	30 October 1904	Column of Adam-Mickiewicz	Ukraine	Lviv	Stare Misto	49.839453 N 24.030012 E	21 m	
	10 August 1906	Monumento a la independencia	Ecuador	Quito	Plaza de la Independencia	0.219833 S 78.512417 W	17.4 m	
	15 November 1908	Prison Ship Martyrs' Monument	United States	Brooklyn	Fort Greene Park	40.691803 N 73.975543 W	45 m	
	1909	Mariensäule	Italy	Bolzano		46.501523 N 11.354488 E		
	1910	Monument to the Viscount of Mauá	Brazil	Rio de Janeiro	Praça Mauá	22.896219 S 43.180941 W	8 m	
	1910	Baiyushan Tower	China	Dalian	Baiyu Mountain	38.809298 N 121.252039 E	66.8 m	
	16 September 1910	El Ángel	Mexico	Mexico City	Paseo de la Reforma	19.427004 N 99.167680 W	45 m	
	November 1910	Grunwald Monument	Ukraine	Ivano-Frankivsk	Taras Shevchenko Park	48.912066 N 24.695682 W	8 m	
	1911	India de El Paraíso	Venezuela	Caracas	Intersection of Páez, O'Higgins, Teherán and Principal de La Vega	10.475210 N 66.946073 W		
	20 October 1912	Monumento a las Batallas de Jaén	Spain	Jaén	Parque de la Concordia	37.772703 N 3.788722 W	12 m	
	1915	Perry's Victory and International Peace Memorial	United States	Put-in-Bay		41.654118 N 82.811319 W	107 m	World's tallest doric column
	1916	Columna a los Mártires	Colombia	Tunja	Plazoleta de San Laureano	5.527128 N 73.363204 W		
	9 October 1918	Columna a los Próceres del 9 de Octubre	Ecuador	Guayaquil	Parque Centenario	2.18997° S 79.88766° W	27 m	
	1920	Sanjan Stambh	India	Sanjan		20.189365 N 72.816668 E	15 m	
	20 March 1921	Bromley Parish Church Memorial	United Kingdom	London	Bromley	51.404999 N 0.012606 E	5 m	
	15 June 1921	Monumento a Cristóbal Colón	Argentina	Buenos Aires	Aeropaque, Costanera Norte	34.556888 S 58.409768 W	26 m	
	1923	Colonne de la Victoire	France	Saint-Denis	Corner of the Avenue de la Victoire and the Rue de Paris	20.878478 S 55.448484 E		
	1924	Jacint Verdaguer Monument	Spain	Barcelona	Plaza de Mosén Jacint Verdaguer	41.399142 N 2.169941 E	21.6 m	
	1926	Astoria Column	United States	Astoria	City Park	46.181327 N 123.817557 W	38 m	
	30 October 1932	Monumento alla Vittoria	Italy	Forlì	Piazzale della Vittoria	44.218153 N 12.050071 E	32 m	
	18 November 1935	Freedom Monument	Latvia	Riga	Freedom Boulevard	56.951461 N 24.113295 E	42 m	
	1 August 1937	Meuse-Argonne American Memorial	France	Montfaucon-d'Argonne		49.272768 N 5.141671 E	71 m	
	27 October 1938	Endless Column	Romania	Târgu Jiu	Ensemble	45.037446 N 23.285378 E	29.3 m	
	24 June 1941	Victory Monument	Thailand	Bangkok	Traffic circle of Phahonyothin Road, Phaya Thai Road, and Ratchawithi Road	13.764921 N 100.538288 E	50 m	
	1944	Monumento de Santiago	Dominican Republic	Santiago de los Caballeros		19.450883 N 70.694735 W	67 m	
	1948	Iglica	Poland	Wrocław		51.107536 N 17.075415 E	96 m	Originally 106 m tall
	1948	Mariensäule	Germany	Waxweiler		50.095645 N 6.369710 E	16 m	
	1951	Monumento aos Heróis da Guerra Peninsular	Portugal	Porto	Rotunda da Boavista	41.157945 N 8.629145 W	45 m	
	1953	Doyle Monument	United Kingdom	Guernsey	Jerbourg Point	49.426998 N 2.534189 W		Replacing an earlier column demolished during the German occupation.
	1957	Cenotaph for the Friendship Between China and USSR	China	Lüshun		38.807023 N 121.235220 E	22.2 m	
	12 July 1975	Monas	Indonesia	Jakarta	Merdeka Square	6.175402 S 106.827128 E	132 m	
	1985	National Capitol Columns	United States	Washington, D.C.	National Arboretum	38.910251 N 76.967537 W		Originally from the portico of the United States Capitol
	2001	Independence Monument	Ukraine	Kyiv	Maidan Nezalezhnosti	50.449522 N 30.525314 E	63 m	
	21 January 2003	Spire of Dublin	Ireland	Dublin	O'Connell Street	53.349812 N 6.260257 W	120 m	replacement for Nelson's Pillar
	15 September 2003	Ángel de la Libertad	Mexico	Chihuahua City	Plaza Mayor	28.639979 N 106.072550 W	35 m	
	2004	Column of Glory	Russia	Saint Petersburg	Trinity Cathedral	59.916475 N 30.307055 E	29 m	Replaces an identical column, destroyed in 1929
	27 March 2004	Candle of Gratitude	Moldova	Soroca		48.137139 N 28.304762 E	29.5 m	
	15 April 2005	Cocking History Column	United Kingdom	Cocking		50.950212 N 0.753411 W	4.57 m	
	10 May 2006	Column of the Archangel Michael	Russia	Sochi		43.582217 N 39.722351 E	20 m	
	23 June 2009	War of Independence Victory Column	Estonia	Tallinn	Freedom Square	59.434016 N 24.743070 E	23.5 m	
	2009	Caja Madrid Obelisk	Spain	Madrid	Plaza de Castilla	40.466027 N 3.689346 W	92 m	
	2010	The Four Columns	Spain	Barcelona	Near the Magic Fountain of Montjuïc	41.370689 N 2.152085 E	20 m	Replace originals, which were demolished in 1928.
	2012	Agostinho Neto Memorial	Angola	Luanda	Praça da República	8.823684 S 13.218869 E	120 m	

== List of Roman victory columns ==
Of the columns listed above, the following are the Roman columns. Roman triumphal columns were either monolithic pillars or composed of column drums; in the later case, these were often hollowed out to accommodate an ancient spiral staircase leading up to the platform on top.

The earliest triumphal column was Trajan's Column which, dedicated in 113 AD, defined its architectural form and established its symbolic value as a political monument alongside the older Roman triumphal arches, providing a lingering model for its successors to this day. The imperial capitals of Rome and Constantinople house the most ancient triumphal columns.

All dimensions are given here in metres, though it was the Roman foot by which ancient architects determined the harmonious proportions of the columns, and which is thus crucial for understanding their design. The list is sorted by date of erection.

Image	Date	Monument	City	Location	Height above ground	Comment
Trajan's Column in Trajan's Forum	AD 113	Trajan's Column	Rome	Trajan's Forum	35.07 m	Archetype of victory column
The extant base of the Column of Antoninus Pius	AD 161	Column of Antoninus Pius	Rome	Campus Martius		
The Column of Marcus Aurelius in Piazza Colonna	Before AD 193	Column of Marcus Aurelius	Rome	Piazza Colonna	39.72 m	Directly modelled on Trajan's Column
The Column of the Goths in Gülhane Park	Between AD 268 and 337	Column of the Goths	Istanbul	Gülhane Park		
Pompey's Pillar	AD 297	Pompey's Pillar	Alexandria		26.85 m	
Column of Constantine in 1912	AD 330	Column of Constantine	Istanbul	Forum of Theodosius		
		Column of Theodosius	Istanbul	Forum of Theodosius		
Column of Arcadius in the Forum of Arcadius	AD 421	Column of Arcadius	Istanbul	Forum of Arcadius		
The Column of Marcian in 2007	AD 455	Column of Marcian	Istanbul			
Reconstruction of the column, after Cornelius Gurlitt, 1912. The depiction of a helical narrative frieze around the column, after the fashion of Trajan's Column, is erroneous.	AD 543	Column of Justinian	Istanbul	Square of the Augustaeum		Destroyed by earthquake in the 16th century
Column of Phocas in the Foro Romano	AD 608	Column of Phocas	Rome	Roman Forum		Last addition to the Forum Romanum

== See also ==
- Record-holding columns in antiquity
- List of modern obelisks
- List of Roman obelisks
- List of Roman spiral stairs
- List of Roman triumphal arches
- Iaat, near Baalbek, Lebanon
- Obelisk
- Rostral column
- Triumphal arch

== Bibliography ==
Part of this page is based on the article Siegessäule in the German-language Wikipedia.

- Adam, Jean-Pierre (1977), "À propos du trilithon de Baalbek: Le transport et la mise en oeuvre des mégalithes", Syria, 54 (1/2): 31–63 (50f.), doi:10.3406/syria.1977.6623
- Gehn, Ulrich (2012). "LSA-2458: Demolished spiral column once crowned by colossal statue of Theodosius I, emperor; later used for statue of Anastasius, emperor. Constantinople, Forum of Theodosius (Tauros). 386-394 and 506". Last Statues of Antiquity. Oxford University.
- Gehn, Ulrich (2012). "LSA-2459: Demolished spiral column once crowned by colossal statue of Arcadius, emperor. Constantinople, Forum of Arcadius. 401-21". Last Statues of Antiquity. Oxford University.
- Jones, Mark Wilson (1993), "One Hundred Feet and a Spiral Stair: The Problem of Designing Trajan's Column", Journal of Roman Archaeology, 6: 23–38, doi:10.1017/S1047759400011454, S2CID 250348951
- Jones, Mark Wilson (2000), Principles of Roman Architecture, Yale University Press, ISBN 0-300-08138-3
