= Column of Arcadius =

Roman triumphal column in the forum of Arcadius in Constantinople

Coordinates: 41.0078°N 28.9431°E

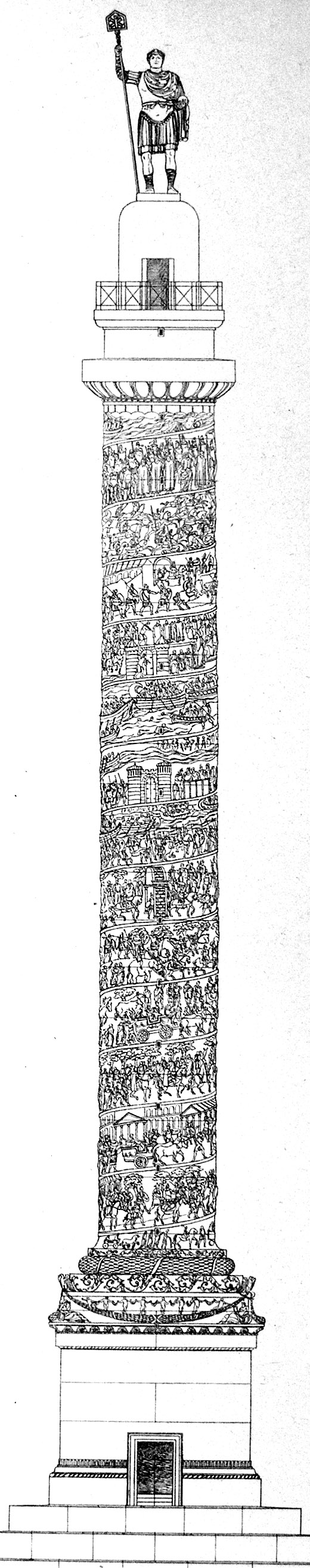
Reconstruction of the Column of Arcadius

The Column of Arcadius (Greek: Στήλη του Αρκαδίου, Turkish: Arkadyos Sütunu or Avrat Taşı) was a Roman triumphal column in the forum of Arcadius in Constantinople built in the early 5th century AD. The marble column was historiated with a spiralling frieze of reliefs on its shaft and supported a colossal statue of the emperor, probably made of bronze, which fell down in 740. Its summit was accessible by an internal spiral staircase. Only its massive masonry base survives.

It is known as the Avret Taş in Turkish and is located on Haseki Kadın Sokak in the Fatih district of Istanbul. It is now mostly surrounded by modern buildings.

== History ==
The column and forum of Arcadius were on the Seventh Hill of Constantinople, also known as the Xerolophos (Greek Ξηρόλοφος). The column's construction was begun after 401 to commemorate Arcadius's triumph over the Goths under the renegade magister militum Gainas in the wars of 399–401. Arcadius died in 408, but the column was only completed in 421, so the forum of Arcadius and its column was sometimes referred to by the name of his son and successor Theodosius II. It was destroyed in the 1719 earthquake.

Inspired by the Column of Constantine erected the previous century by his predecessor and the city's founder Constantine I, the Column of Theodosius had been set up by Arcadius's father Theodosius I in the forum Tauri in the 380s and follows the tradition of triumphal columns established by those of Trajan and Marcus Aurelius.

During the Ottoman Empire, the monument was ascended and measured, in secret, by Petrus Gyllius and described in his De Topographia Constantinopoleos et de illius antiquitatibus libri IV. He described the shaft as being composed of 21 large blocks; only one at the base survives. Detail of the shaft's and pedestal's decoration is conserved in a series of drawings made in 1574 and 1575 and preserved in the Freshfield Album and which are attributed to the Flemish artist Lambert de Vos (Trinity College, Cambridge). The carvings on the remaining parts of the structure have since been largely obliterated by fire and erosion.

Nowadays the column is becoming ruined by an unplanned urbanization in Istanbul. Turkish officials say that conservation works including creating a small square around its vicinity for the column must be carried out.

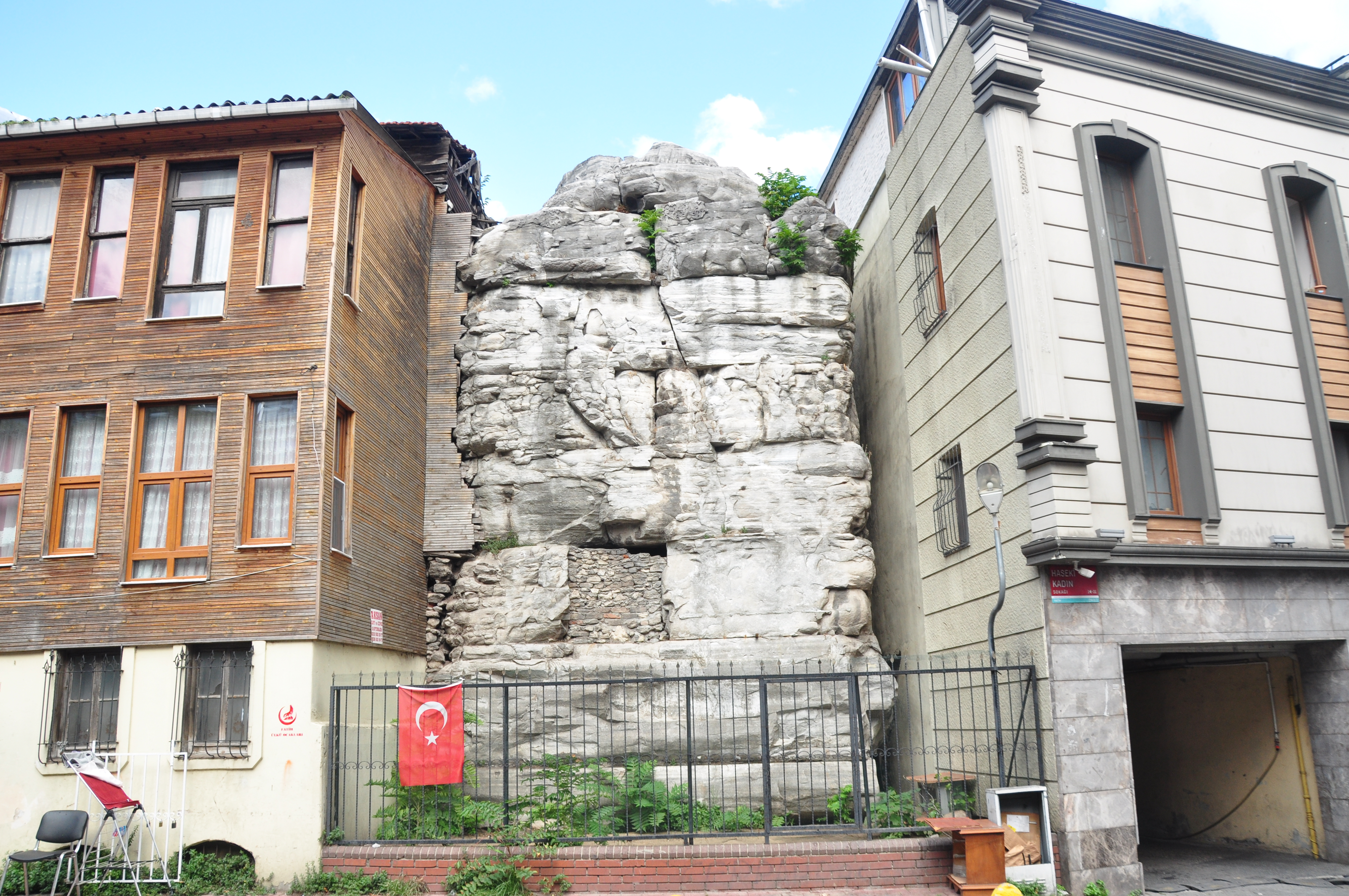
Column of Arcadius in 2022

== Description ==
The socle was around 2 m (6 ft 7 in) high and of three steps, of which only one remains above ground. A pedestal, nearly 8 m (26 ft) tall with cornice and mouldings at the top and bottom, that probably faced the Mese odos to the south and whose southern, eastern and western faces were decorated with carved reliefs in four registers. The north side, mostly undecorated and probably facing away from the Mese, had a doorway which allowed access to the spiral staircase within. The pedestal contained three small rooms, the first of which had a niche in the western wall and was decorated with a cross-in-wreath. The staircase led to a door on the south face of the column's statue's pedestal, giving access to a platform atop the column's capital. The pedestal's four registers of reliefs were carved on its four courses of monolithic masonry. Above the pedestal's cornice was a plinth of two steps, decorated with eagles at its corners holding garlands with putti above and reclining river gods below. Above this was a torus carved as an oak wreath bound by a floral filet depicting theatrical masks and mythological hunt scenes involving lions, griffons, and birds. This was the base of the column itself; the surviving portion of the column terminates here; nothing above remains.

The column shaft was carved with reliefs depicting the history of the campaigns against Gainas and his Gothic foederati rebels in 399–401. The sculptural register spiralled up clockwise around the column until the egg-and-dart echinus underneath the Doric capital at the top. Each corner of the abacus, on the capital's underside, was embellished with a Chi-Rho. Taken together, the shaft, plinth, and torus were about 31.92 m (104.7 ft) tall. On the capital rested the statue's pedestal, about 4 m (13 ft) high, with smooth shaft and a "Pergamene capital". The statue itself was probably around 8.5 m (28 ft) tall and similar to the one known to have been atop the Column of Theodosius.

The monument's pedestal depicted Triumph celebrated by Arcadius and his brother and co-emperor Honorius, augustus of the West. Although the victory over Gainas was a success in Arcadius's eastern jurisdiction, the emperors are shown together as equals in a joint Triumph that never took place. The lowest of the four registers of reliefs showed bound barbarian captives and arms (west), Victories inscribing on shields with captives (east), and Victories carrying tropaia and leading captives and female personifications of cities bearing tribute (south). The next register showed Victories with a trophy approached on either side by Roman soldiers leading captives (west), Senators presenting the annual senatorial tribute, the aurum oblaticium, together with the Tyche of Constantinople and of Rome, each wearing their corona muralis (east) and the co-emperors in armour, affronted and holding Victories standing on globes above bound captives and flanked by ranks of soldiers and statesmen (south). The third register from the bottom showed the paired emperors in armour leaning on their spears and holding globes, attended by soldiers and officials (west), the emperors in civilian dress as consul, with lictors, soldiers and statesmen (east), and a pair of flying Victories bearing a wreath surrounding a Chi-Rho, each beside a trophy (south). The fourth, topmost register of carvings showed airborne Victories holding a laurel wreath surrounding a Latin cross, alongside each a putto, and the Sun and Moon in their quadrigae (west), flying Victories holding a tabula emblazoned with a cross, flanked by putti with torches (east), and diverse armour and weapons together with two Chi-Rho banners.

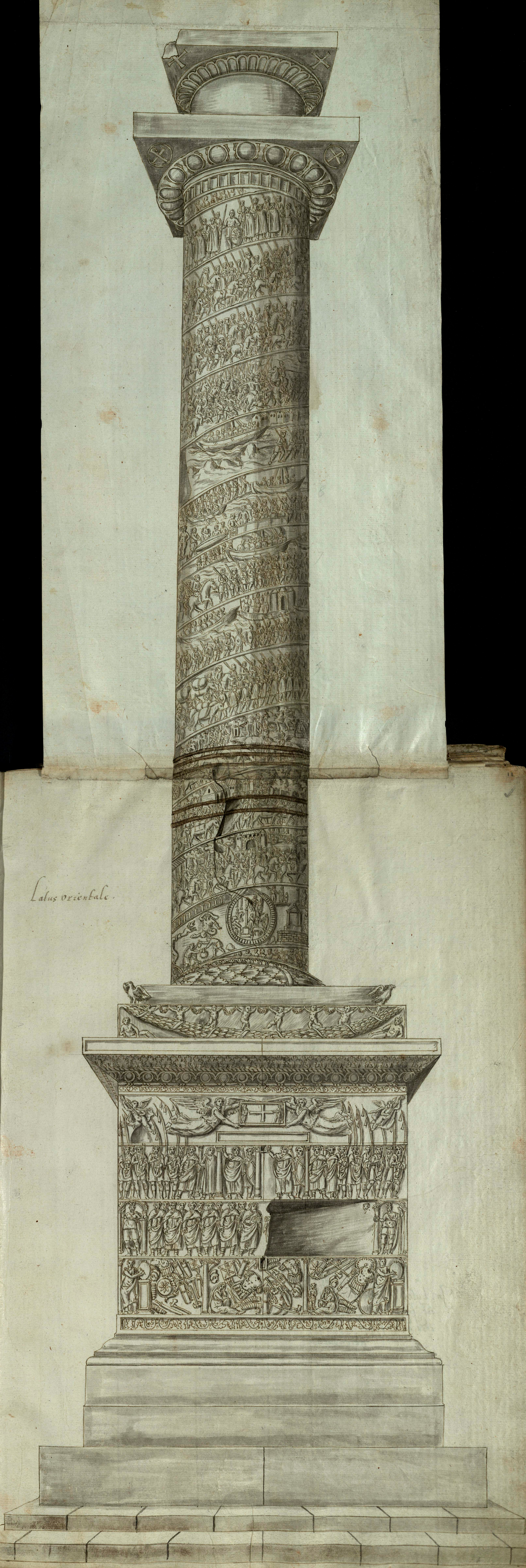
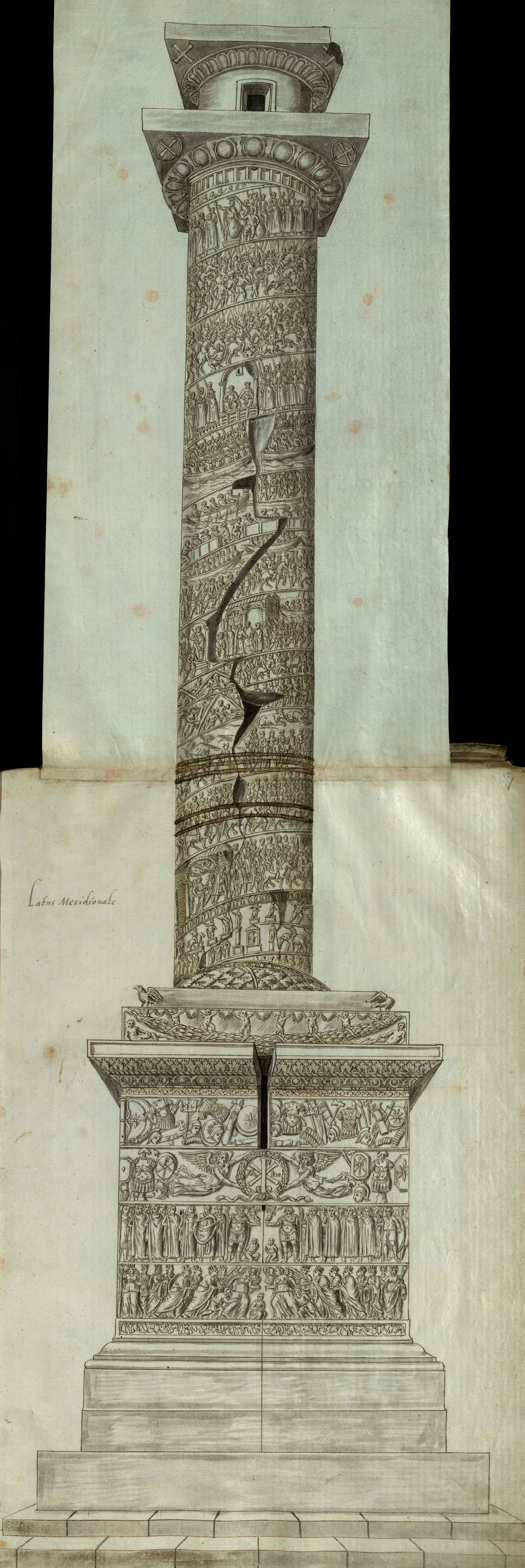
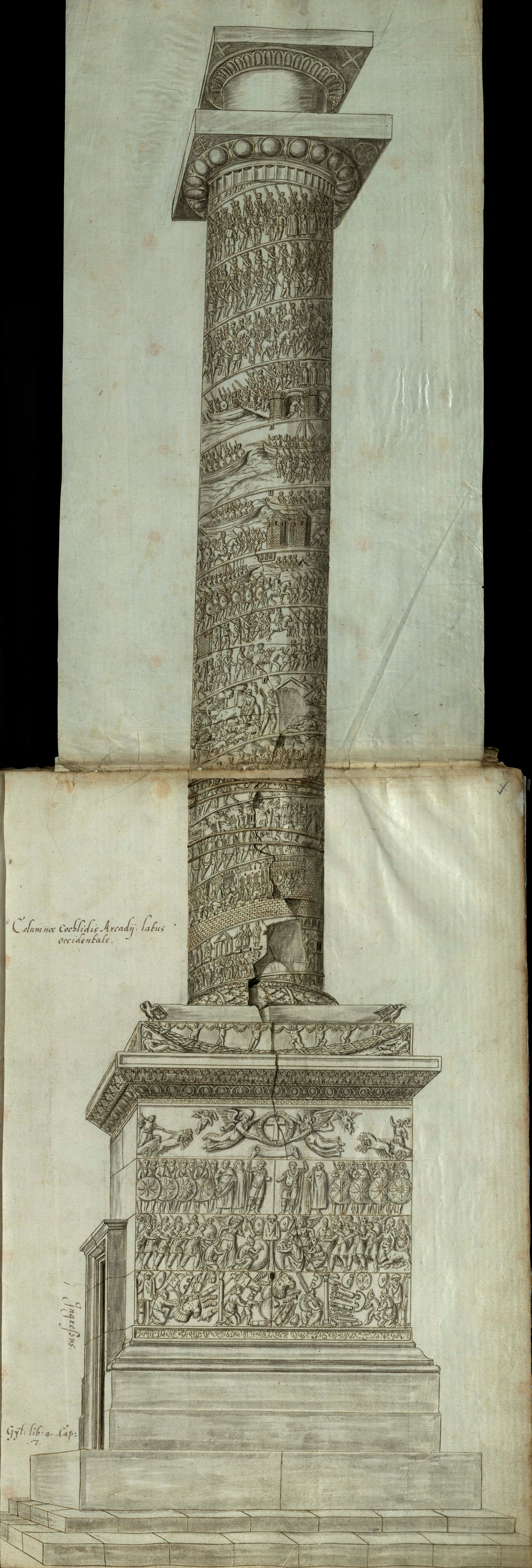
Multiple views of the Column of Arcadius, from the "Freshfield album"

== Bibliography ==
- Bauer, Franz Alto (1996). Stadt, Platz und Denkmal in der Spätantike: Untersuchungen zur Ausstattung des öffentlichen Raums in den spätantiken Städten Rom, Konstantinopel und Ephesos (in German). Mainz: P. von Zabern. ISBN 978-3-8053-1842-6.
- Gehn, Ulrich. (2012) "LSA-2459: Demolished spiral column once crowned by colossal statue of Arcadius, emperor. Constantinople, Forum of Arcadius. 401-21". Last Statues of Antiquity. Oxford University.
- Konrad, C. B. "Beobachtungen zur Architektur und Stellung des Säulenmonumentes in Istanbul-Cerrahpaşa - 'Arkadiossäule'", Istanbuler Mitteilungen 51, 2001, 319–401. (in German)
- Kollwitz, Johannes (1978). Oströmische Plastik der theodosianischen Zeit. Berlin, Boston: De Gruyter. pp. 17–68. ISBN 978-3-11-084053-7.
- Müller-Wiener, Wolfgang (1977). Bildlexikon zur Topographie Istanbuls: Byzantion, Konstantinupolis, Istanbul bis zum Beginn d. 17 Jh (in German). Tübingen: Wasmuth. ISBN 978-3-8030-1022-3.

== See also ==
- List of ancient spiral stairs
- Ancient Roman architecture
