= List of ancient spiral stairs =

Section view of the interior stairway and the pedestal of Trajan's Column (click on interactive image)

The list of ancient spiral stairs contains a selection of Greco-Roman spiral stairs constructed during classical antiquity. The spiral stair is a type of stairway which, due to its complex helical structure, has been introduced relatively late into architecture. Although the oldest example dates back to the 5th century BC, it was only in the wake of the influential design of the Trajan's Column that this space-saving new type permanently caught hold in ancient Roman architecture.

Apart from the triumphal columns in the imperial cities of Rome and Constantinople, other types of buildings such as temples, thermae, basilicas and tombs were also fitted with spiral stairways. Their notable absence in the towers of the Aurelian Wall indicates that they did not yet figure prominently in Roman military engineering. By late antiquity, separate stair towers were constructed adjacent to the main buildings, like in the Basilica of San Vitale.

The construction of spiral stairs passed on both to Christian and Islamic architecture.

== Spiral stairs ==
Monument	Location	Country	Date of construction	Height	Number of stairways	Comment
Temple A	Selinunte	Italy	c. 480 BC		2	
Temple of Bel	Palmyra	Syria	1st century			
Trajan's Column	Rome	Italy	113	29.68 m	1	14 steps per turn
Column of Marcus Aurelius	Rome	Italy	Late 2nd century	29.62 m	1	14 steps per turn
Baths of Caracalla	Rome	Italy	212–216		2	
Baths of Diocletian	Rome	Italy	298–305		4	
Round Temple at Ostia	Rome	Italy	3rd century		1	
Santa Costanza	Rome	Italy	c. 350		1	
Tomb of Galerius	Thessaloniki	Greece	Early 4th century		2	
Imperial Baths	Trier	Germany	Early 4th century		8	
Column of Theodosius	Constantinople	Turkey	386–393/4	c. 50 m	1	Total former column height
St. Gereon's Basilica	Cologne	Germany	Late 4th century	16.50 m (Note: Ancient staircase preserved to this height)	1	
Column of Arcadius	Constantinople	Turkey	401–421	c. 46.09 m	1	Total former column height
Basilica of San Vitale	Ravenna	Italy	527–548		2	A pair of stair towers
Gate of the Great Palace	Constantinople	Turkey	532 (Note: Date of evidence)	?	?	Procopius (Pers. 1.24.43) refers to sortie down a spiral stairway
Sangarius Bridge	Adapazarı	Turkey	559–562	10.37 m (Note: Height of arched doorway)	1	Located in pier of triumphal arch at entrance of bridge

== Gallery ==
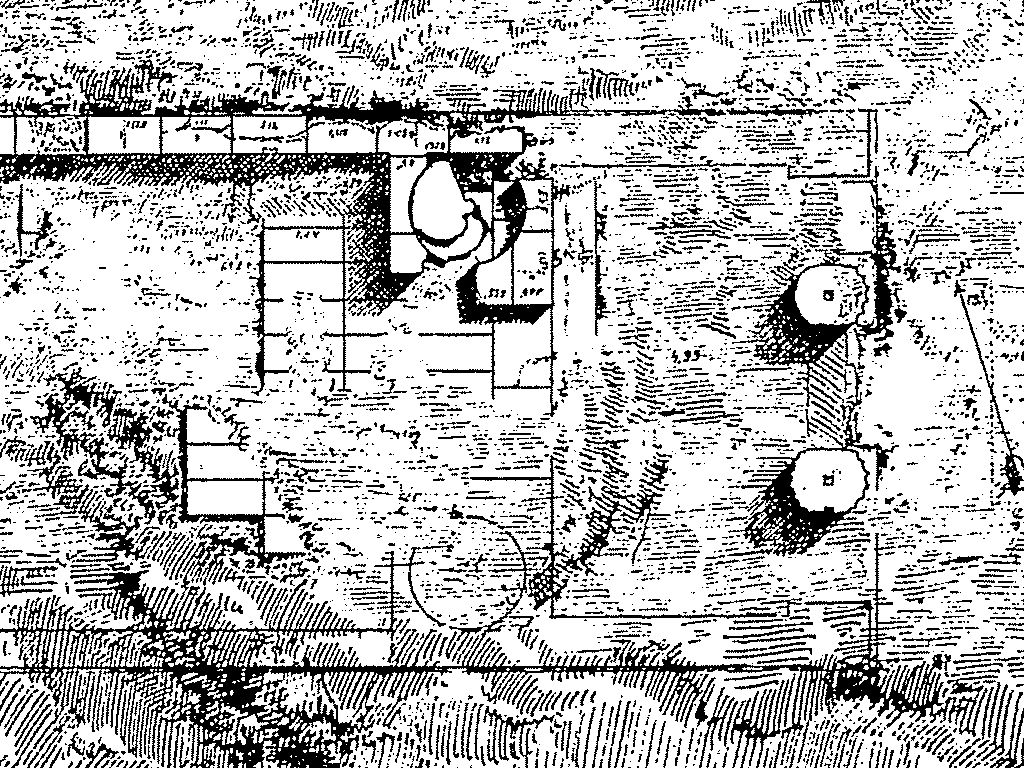
Plan of ground floor of the Greek Temple A at Selinunte. The remains of the two spiral stairs between the pronaos and the cella are the oldest known to date (c. 480 BC).

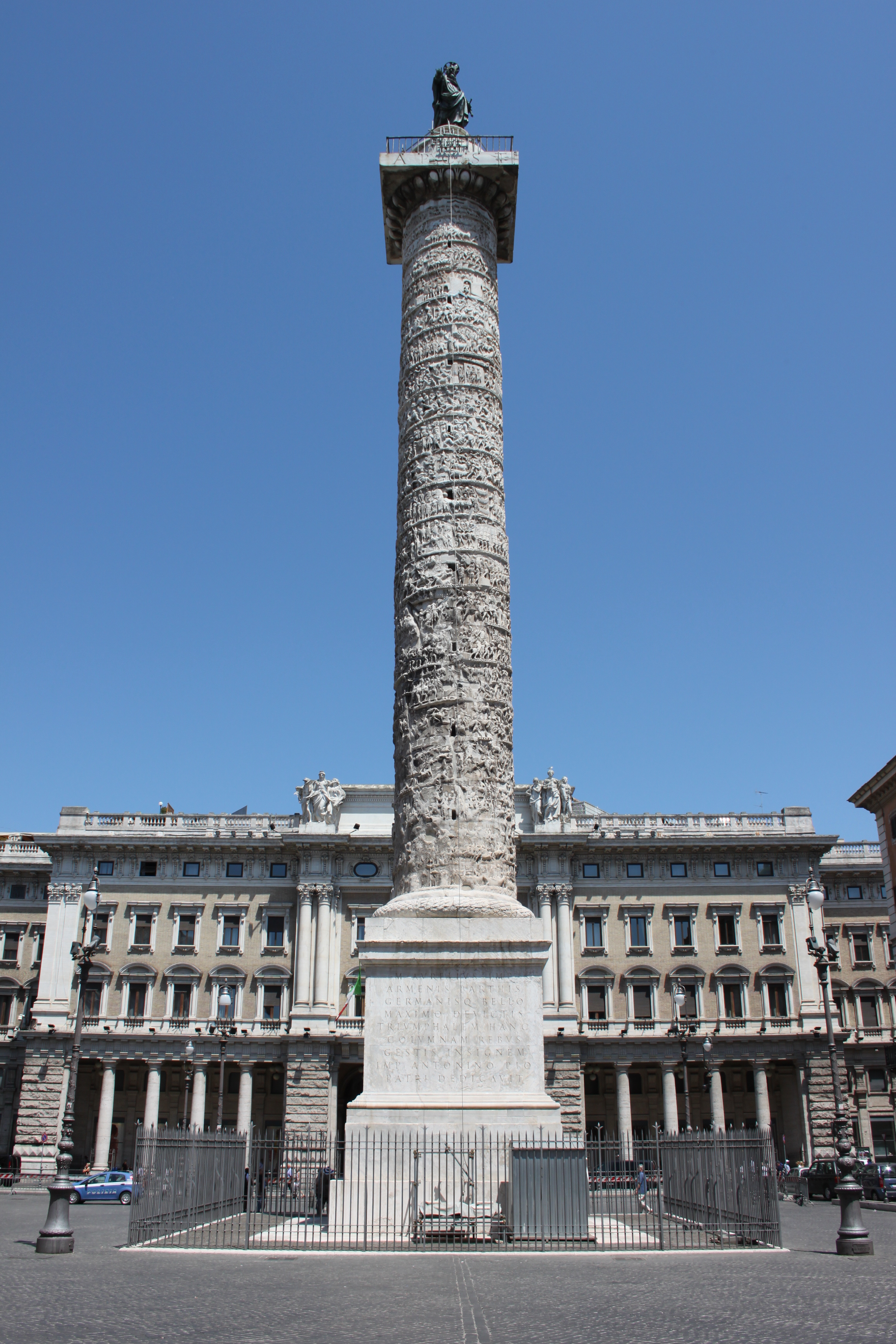
Column of Marcus Aurelius. An almost 30 m high spiral staircase winds up inside, with 14 steps per full turn.

== See also ==
- Greek architecture
- Greek technology
- Roman technology
- Roman engineering

== Bibliography ==
- Beckmann, Martin (2002), "The 'Columnae Coc(h)lides' of Trajan and Marcus Aurelius", Phoenix, 56 (3/4): 348–357, doi:10.2307/1192605, JSTOR 1192605
- Gehn, Ulrich (2012). "LSA-2458: Demolished spiral column once crowned by colossal statue of Theodosius I, emperor; later used for statue of Anastasius, emperor. Constantinople, Forum of Theodosius (Tauros). 386-394 and 506". Last Statues of Antiquity. Oxford University.
- Gehn, Ulrich (2012). "LSA-2459: Demolished spiral column once crowned by colossal statue of Arcadius, emperor. Constantinople, Forum of Arcadius. 401-21". Last Statues of Antiquity. Oxford University.
- Jones, Mark Wilson (1993), "One Hundred Feet and a Spiral Stair: The Problem of Designing Trajan's Column", Journal of Roman Archaeology, 6: 23–38, doi:10.1017/S1047759400011454, S2CID 250348951
- Rasch, Jürgen (1985), "Die Kuppel in der römischen Architektur. Entwicklung, Formgebung, Konstruktion", Architectura, vol. 15, pp. 117–139
- Ruggeri, Stefania (2006), Selinunt, Messina: Edizioni Affinità Elettive, ISBN 88-8405-079-0
- Schäfke, Werner (1984), Kölns romanische Kirchen. Architektur, Ausstattung, Geschichte, Köln, ISBN 3-7701-1360-8
- Whitby, Michael (1985), "Justinian's Bridge over the Sangarius and the Date of Procopius' de Aedificiis", The Journal of Hellenic Studies, 105, The Society for the Promotion of Hellenic Studies: 129–148, doi:10.2307/631526, JSTOR 631526, S2CID 162501276
