= Column of Constantine =

Roman monumental column in Istanbul

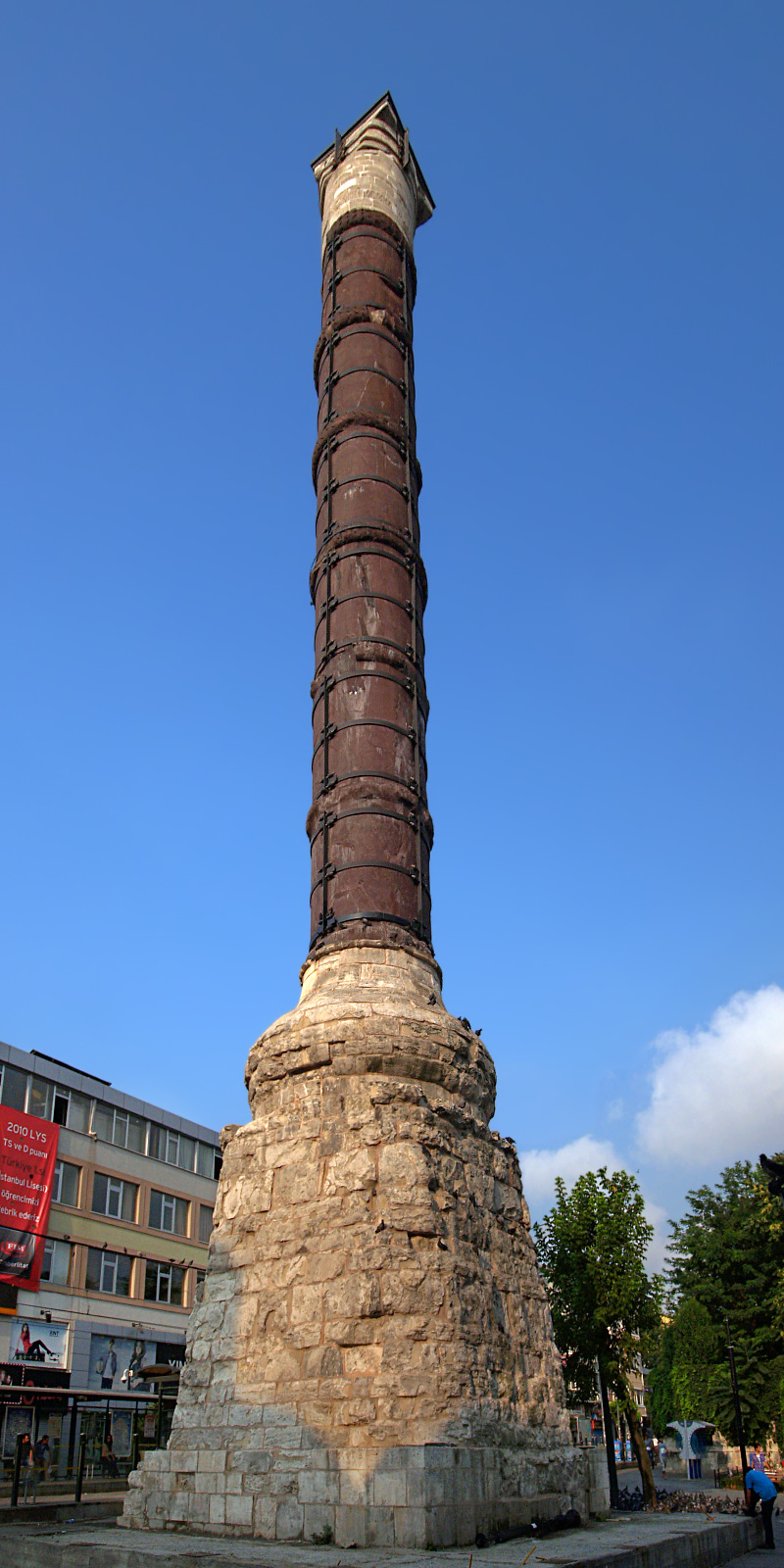
- The Column of Constantine in Istanbul, made of Egyptian porphyry, seen here as purple column drums.

- Location within Istanbul
- 41°00′31″N 28°58′16″E
- Location: Fatih, Istanbul, Turkey.

History
- Built: AD 328; 1698 years ago

The Column of Constantine (Turkish: Çemberlitaş Sütunu; Greek: Στήλη του Κωνσταντίνου Α΄; Latin: Columna Constantini) is a monumental column commemorating the dedication of Constantinople by Roman emperor Constantine the Great on 11 May 330 AD. Completed c. 328 AD, it is the oldest Constantinian monument to survive in Istanbul. The column stood in the centre of the Forum of Constantine, on the second-highest of the seven hills of Nova Roma, and was midway along the Mese odos, the ancient city's main thoroughfare.

Ottoman repairs in c. 1515 added iron reinforcing hoops to the shaft. The column was consequently given the Turkish name Çemberlitaş (from çemberli 'hooped' and taş 'stone'), which also came to refer to the surrounding area.

The column stands at the point where Yeniçeriler Caddesi ('Street of the Janissaries') joined the Divan Yolu ('Road to the Divan'), the two streets connecting Sultanahmet Square with Beyazıt Square and roughly following the course of the old Mese odos. The Roman street led eastward to the Augustaion, the Hippodrome, Hagia Sophia, the Baths of Zeuxippus, and the Chalke Gate of the Great Palace. To the west it led through the Forum of Theodosius to the Philadelphion and the walls of Constantinople. In Constantine's Forum itself the emperor established the original home of the Byzantine Senate.

The column stands right beside the Çemberlitaş stop on the T1 tramline.

== Description ==
The column shaft is composed of very large porphyry column drums set on a white marble pedestal that is no longer visible.

Its top is 34.8 m above the present-day ground level. Estimates of the original height of the column, without the statue that stood on the top, vary between 37 and 40 m; the monument as a whole would have been nearly 50 m tall. It may have been the largest Roman honorific column of all, rivalled only by the later Column of Theodosius in Constantinople, now demolished. Constantine's Column was taller than Trajan's Column and the Column of Marcus Aurelius in Rome; its size approached or exceeded the height of the Colosseum (48 m) and the internal height of the Pantheon (43 m) in Rome.

Today the column is held together with metal bands and popular as a place to perch with local pigeons.

== History ==
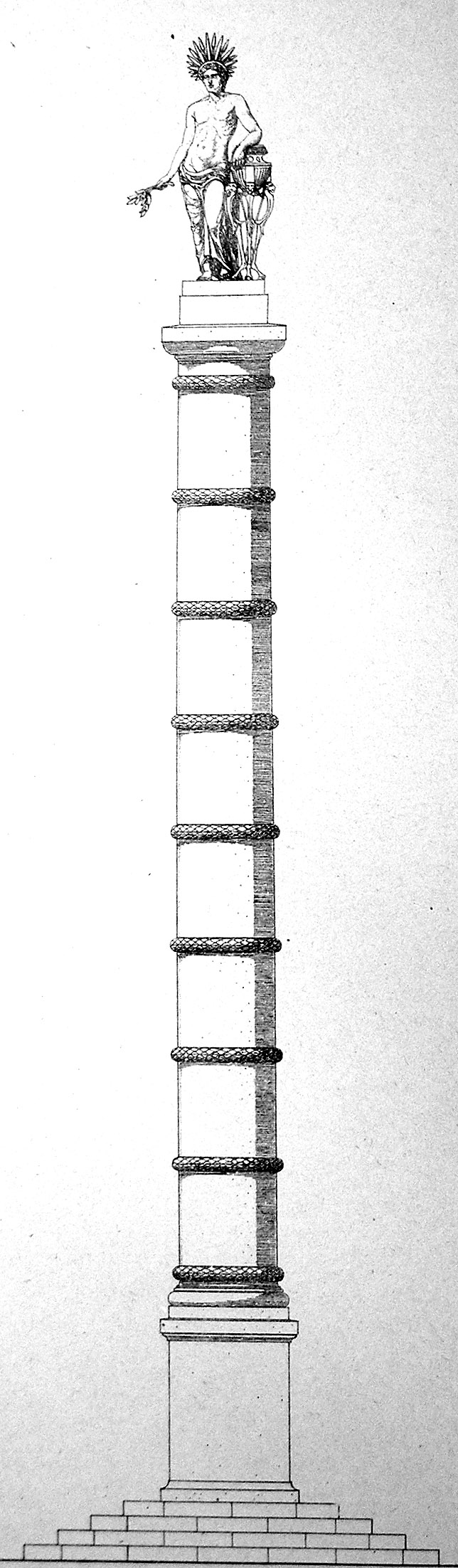
The Column of Constantine in its original form, with the statue of Constantine as Apollo on top

The column was dedicated on May 11, 330 AD, with a mixture of Christian and pagan ceremonies. In Constantine's day the column was at the centre of the Forum of Constantine (today known as Çemberlitaş Square), an oval forum situated outside the city walls in the vicinity of what may have been the west gate of Antoninia. On its erection, the column was 50 meters tall, constructed of several cylindrical porphyry blocks. Monolithic porphyry columns were more common, and some Byzantine sources refer to Constantine's monument as such, but in reality this construction technique was made impractical by the column's great size. The exact number of porphyry blocks is disputed, but common figures range from seven, up to as many as eleven. The joins between them were masked by sculptured laurel wreaths. At the summit of the column was a bronze statue of Constantine, probably nude, wearing a seven-point radiate crown and holding a spear and orb. Its appearance probably referred to the Colossus of Rhodes and to the Colossus of Nero in Rome; all resembled the solar deities Helios or Apollo. The orb was said to contain a fragment of the True Cross. At the foot of the column was a sanctuary which contained relics allegedly from the crosses of the two thieves who were crucified with Jesus at Calvary, the baskets from the loaves and fishes miracle, an alabaster ointment jar belonging to Mary Magdalene and used by her for anointing the head and feet of Jesus, and the palladium of ancient Rome (a wooden statue of Pallas Athena from Troy). A 16th-century drawing by Melchior Lorck records a now-lost relief sculpture on the north part of the column base: the symmetrical composition centers upon an emperor's bust within a laurel wreath, flanked by two Victories and surrounded by humbled barbarians offering tribute. It is thought that the two barbarians represent Persia and Germania, two traditional enemies of Rome.

Bronze reinforcements had to be added the column as early as 416 and it sustained fire damage in the 5th and 6th centuries.

A strong gale in 1106 AD felled the statue and three of the upper cylinders of the column. Some years later, Byzantine emperor Manuel I Komnenos (reigned 1143–1180) placed a cross on top in place of the original statue and added a commemorative inscription that read "Faithful Manuel invigorated this holy work of art, which has been damaged by time". During the Sack of Constantinople in 1204, Latin Crusaders stole the bronze wreaths which had covered the joints between the drums. The cross was removed by the Ottoman Turks after the fall of Constantinople in 1453.

Earthquakes and a fire in 1779 destroyed the neighbourhood surrounding the column, leaving it with black scorch marks and earning it the name 'Burnt Column' (or, according to Gibbon, 'Burned Pillar'). The column was restored by Abdülhamid I, who had the present masonry base added. The base was strengthened in 1779. The original platform of the column is 2.5 meters (about 8 feet) below ground.

Restoration work has taken place intermittently since 1955. Cracks in the porphyry were filled and metal brackets renewed in 1972. Further restoration work took place in the years leading up to 2010.

Since 1985, the monuments of the historic areas of Istanbul, including the Column, have been listed as a UNESCO World Heritage Site.

== See also ==
- Roman architecture
- List of museums and monuments in Istanbul
- List of public art in Istanbul

== Bibliography ==
- Bassett, Sarah (2004). "109. Column of Constantine and Its Statue". The Urban Image of Late Antique Constantinople. Cambridge: Cambridge University Press. pp. 192–204. ISBN 0-521-82723-X. OCLC 54024141.
- Gehn, Ulrich (2012). "LSA-2457 Porphyry Column, once crowned by colossal statue of Constantine I. Constantinople, Forum of Constantine. 328". Last Statues of Antiquity. Oxford University.
- Mango, Cyril (1981). "Constantine's Porphyry Column and the Chapel of St. Constantine". Δελτίον XAE. 10 (4): 103–110. doi:10.12681/dchae.901.
- Yoncaci Arslan, Pelin (2016). "Towards a New Honorific Column: The Column of Constantine In Early Byzantine Urban Landscape". METU Journal of the Faculty of Architecture. 33 (1). Middle East Technical University: 121–145. doi:10.4305/METU.JFA.2016.1.5. hdl:11511/39361.
- Sergey Ivanov (2022). In Search of Constantinople - A Guidebook through Byzantine Istanbul, and Its Surroundings. Kitap Yayınevi. ISBN 978-6051052144.
