= Grunwald Monument, Ivano-Frankivsk =

Former monument in Ivano-Frankivsk, Ukraine

Grunwald Monument
- Polish: Pomnik Grunwaldzki; Ukrainian: Грюнвальдський Пам'ятник; German: Grunwald-Denkmal
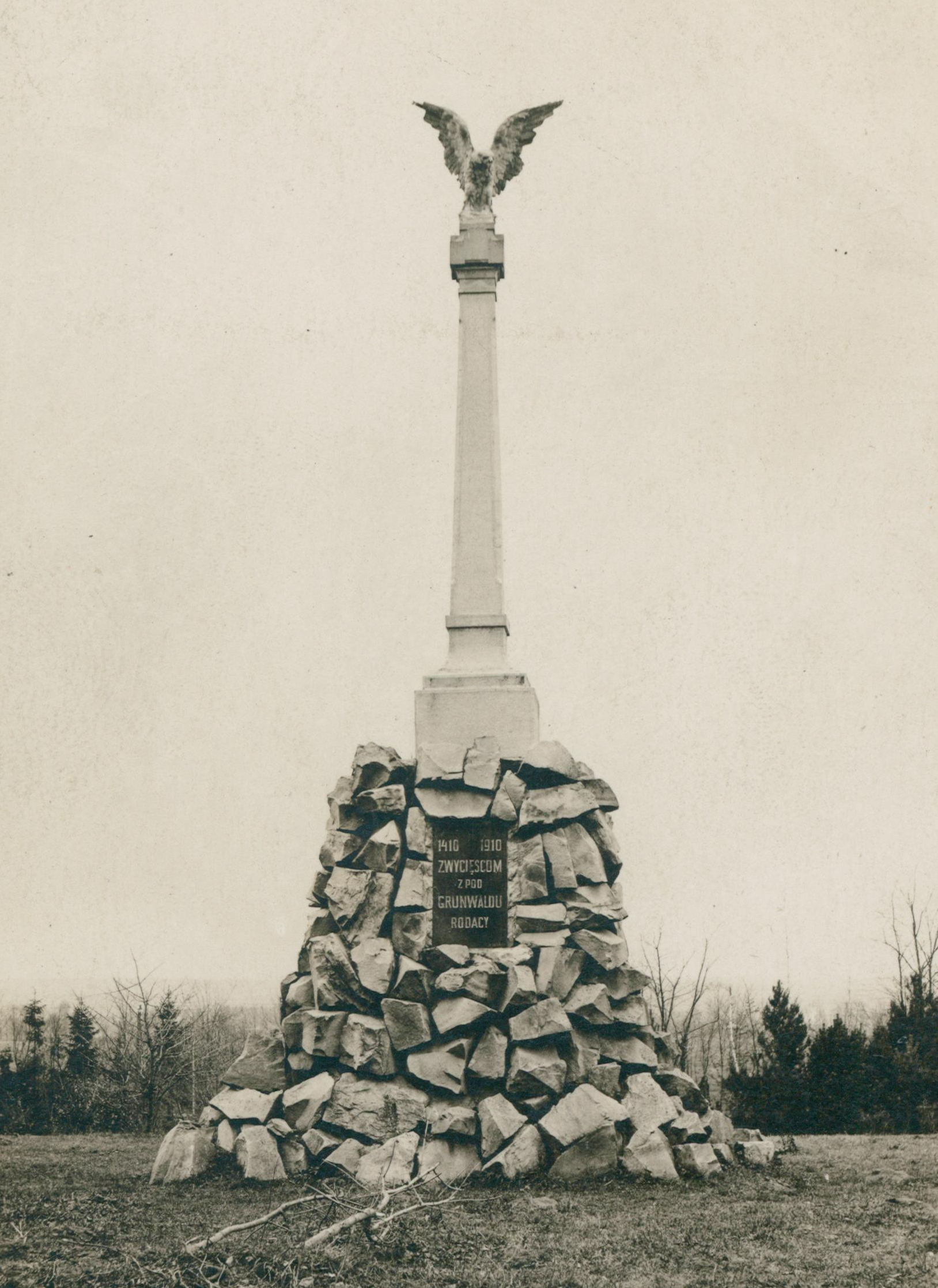
- The Grunwald Monument, circa 1915.
- Interactive map of Grunwald Monument
- Location: Ivano-Frankivsk, Ukraine
- Coordinates: 48°54′43″N 24°41′44″E
- Type: Victory column
- Completion date: November 1910
- Dedicated to: 500th anniversary of the Battle of Grunwald
- Dismantled date: 1942

The Grunwald Monument (Polish: Pomnik Grunwaldzki, Ukrainian: Грюнвальдський Пам'ятник) was a monument erected in Stanisławów (present-day Ivano-Frankivsk, Ukraine) in the city's Empress Elisabeth Park for the 500th anniversary of the Battle of Grunwald.

== History ==
In 1910, the 500th anniversary of the Battle of Grunwald was solemnly celebrated throughout Galicia, with main celebrations taking place in Kraków between July 14 and 17—becoming the largest single Polish patriotic demonstration under the partitions. The grandeur of the celebrations in Kraków, including the unveiling of a monumental statue to the victorious Polish King Władysław II Jagiełło, inspired the spontaneous organization of similar commemorations in the city of Stanisławów. Many of the city's residents expressed a desire to attend the historic jubilee in Kraków; for this reason, local celebrations were postponed by two months to allow them to participate. At the commemorations, Vice-Mayor Karol Fiedler and Councilor Józef Sroczyński served as the city's official delegates.

In Stanisławów, a committee was formed to organize the celebrations marking the 500th anniversary of the Battle of Grunwald. C. Lachowski served as chairman and J. Krajewski as secretary. Among its members was the then-mayor of the city, Artur Nimhin. Plans to erect a monument in Stanisławów marking the anniversary were only unveiled in September, with the local newspaper Kurjer Stanisławowski (issue no. 1304 dated September 4, 1910) writing as follows:

—Grunwald Stone in the City Park. The committee responsible for organizing the Grunwald anniversary celebrations has resolved to place a commemorative stone in the city park. Work on setting up this stone has already begun. It will be installed on the main flowerbed in the new section of the park, by the pond, with a view toward the mountains and Zagwoźdź's forests. The stone will be approximately 6 meters high, and atop it will rise a white eagle made of cement. The base of the stone will measure 3 by 2½ meters. Between the individual boulders of the stone [at the base], alpine flowers will be cultivated, so that it will not only serve as a memorial to the momentous victory, but also as a really beautiful ornament of the park. The placement of the boulders and the planting [of flowers between them] are being overseen by the municipal planting inspector, Mr. Robinson.

The anniversary celebrations in Stanisławów were scheduled for 18 September 1910; however, work on the monument continued well into November, including the polishing of the obelisk column, which brought the monument’s height to nearly 8 meters. Finally, in December, with the committee nearing dissolution, it published a report on its expenses for the celebrations, including the construction of the monument, in the pages of Kurjer Stanisławowski. The cost of the monument alone amounted to 1,968 crowns and 20 heller, making it the largest single expenditure. The remaining expenses totaled 2,945 crowns and 31 heller, which included costs for printing and postage, commemorative materials, a theater performance, and street decorations.

At its unveiling, the monument was described as modest yet tastefully crafted. Contemporary observers noted the elegance of the obelisk. The monument was listed alongside the Mickiewicz Monument in the 1930 Przewodnik ilustrowany po województwie stanisławowskiem (Illustrated Guide to the Stanisławów Voivodeship), published in collaboration with the Provincial Tourist Commission in Stanisławów.

The monument stood for a little over 30 years. By the time Stanisławów fell under German occupation in 1941 during the Second World War, it had already sustained damage. Ultimately, in 1942, the monument was blown up by the Germans. According to a local legend, the descendants of the Teutons could not tolerate a reminder of their ancient defeat in the city they had just captured. Today, a monument dedicated to Ukrainian poet and writer Shevchenko marks the location where the monument once stood.

== Description ==
The Grunwald Monument stood in Empress Elisabeth Park in Stanisławów (present-day Ivano-Frankivsk, Ukraine). It was modest in form, resembling a victory column. Its dimensions vary between sources—per Kurjer Stanisławowski, it was originally projected to reach 6 meters. However, its column appears to have ultimately reached a height of 8 meters. At its top stood a white eagle, a Polish national symbol, made of cement with its wings outstretched. Its base, measuring 3 by 2.5 meters, consisting of boulders stacked against each other, with alpine flowers cultivated between them. A plaque was affixed to the base, bearing the following inscription:

Inscription (Polish)

1410 1910
ZWYCIĘSCOM
Z POD
GRUNWALDU
RODACY

Translation (English)

1410 1910
TO THE VICTORS
FROM [UNDER]
GRUNWALD
FELLOW COUNTRYMEN

== See also ==
- Grunwald Monument, Kraków
