= Çemberlitaş, Fatih =

Quarter in Fatih, Istanbul

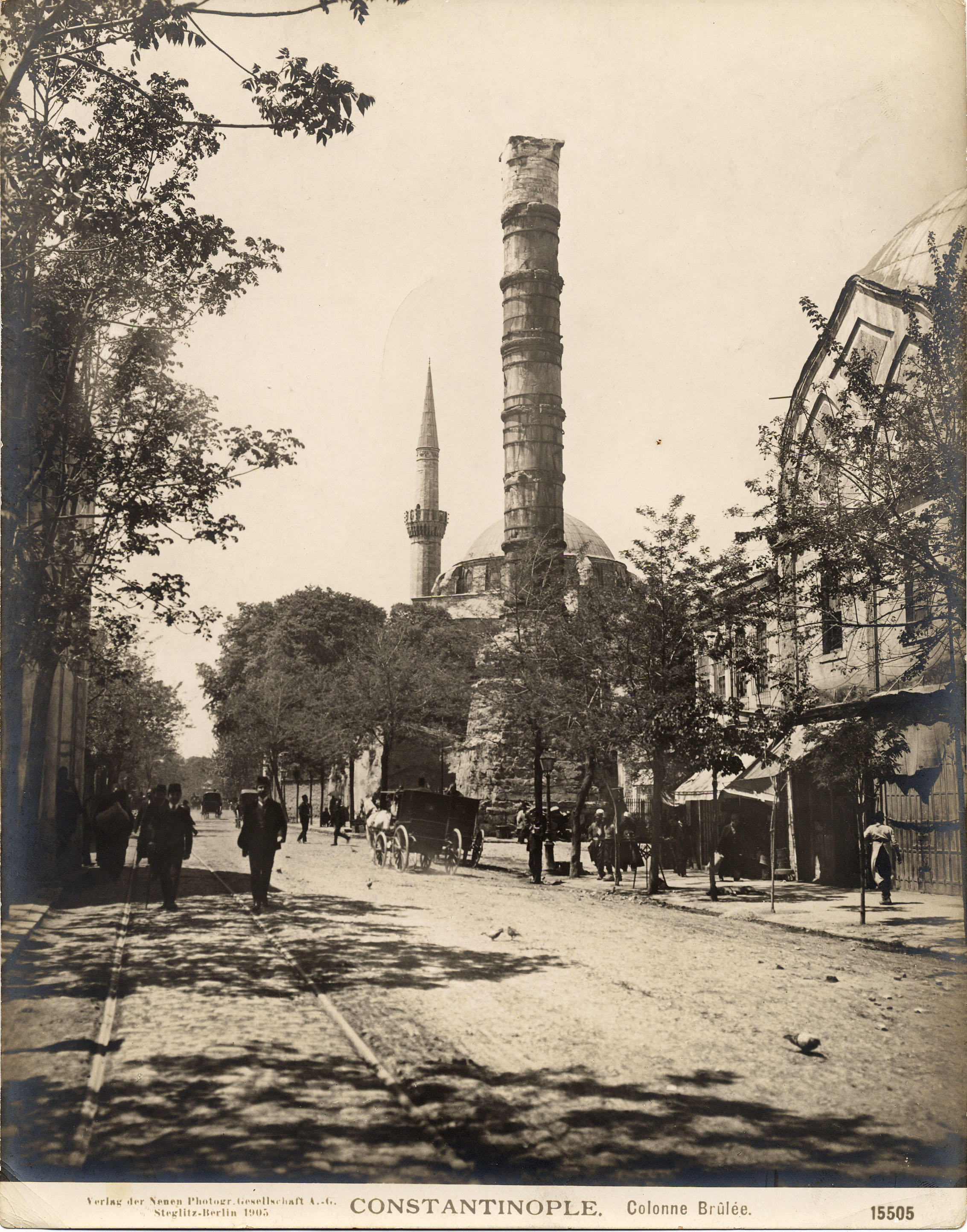
Çemberlitaş, Fatih, in 1905, with the Column of Constantine (here referenced as the 'Burnt Column' (Colonne Brûlée)) and the Gazi Atik Ali Paşa Mosque in the background.

Çemberlitaş is a quarter in the Fatih district of Istanbul on the European side of the city. It takes its name from the Çemberlitaş Column, also known as the Column of Constantine, which stands beside the Çemberlitaş stop on the T1 tram line. The column is called Çemberlitaş (meaning 'hooped stone') because of the iron reinforcement hoops girdled around it during restoration works by the Ottomans in 1515 and in the reign of Mustafa II (1695–1704).

Çemberlitaş abuts Sultanahmet to the east, Cağaloğlu to the north, Beyazit to the west and Gedikpaşa to the south.

At the heart of Çemberlitaş is a large square framed to the south by Divan Yolu with the tramline running along it. On the east side is Çemberlitaş Hamamı, an Ottoman bathhouse probably designed by the famous 16th-century architect Mimar Sinan with separate sections for men and women (it's still in business today). Adjoining it is the crumbling 17th-century Vezir Hanı. The Nuruosmaniye Mosque forms the northern side of the square, abutting the Grand Bazaar. On the south side of the tramline is the small mid-17th-century Köprülü Mosque built for the grand vizier Köprülü Mehmed Paşa.

Heading west from the main square run a string of small mosques and religious complexes: the late 15th-century Atik Ali Paşa Mosque, the Koca Sinan Paşa complex and the Çorlulu Ali Paşa complex are on the north side of the tramline while the Kara Mustafa Paşa complex is on its south side.

== Forum of Constantine and the Çemberlitaş ==
Çemberlitaş was originally the site of one of the forums that dotted Divan Yolu. The original Forum of Constantine was an oval-shaped public arena surrounded by porticoes and filled with statuary. In 330, when he decided to make Byzantium the capital of the Eastern Roman Empire, the Emperor Constantine had a porphyry column erected in the middle of the forum with a statue of himself as Apollo on the top of it. The column was badly damaged by an earthquake in 416 since when it has been held together by iron bands. The statue on the top survived until 1106 when it was replaced with a large cross that survived until the Conquest of İstanbul in 1453. I
