= Verziere =

Greengrocery street market in Milan, Italy

Coordinates: 45.4630°N 9.1959°E

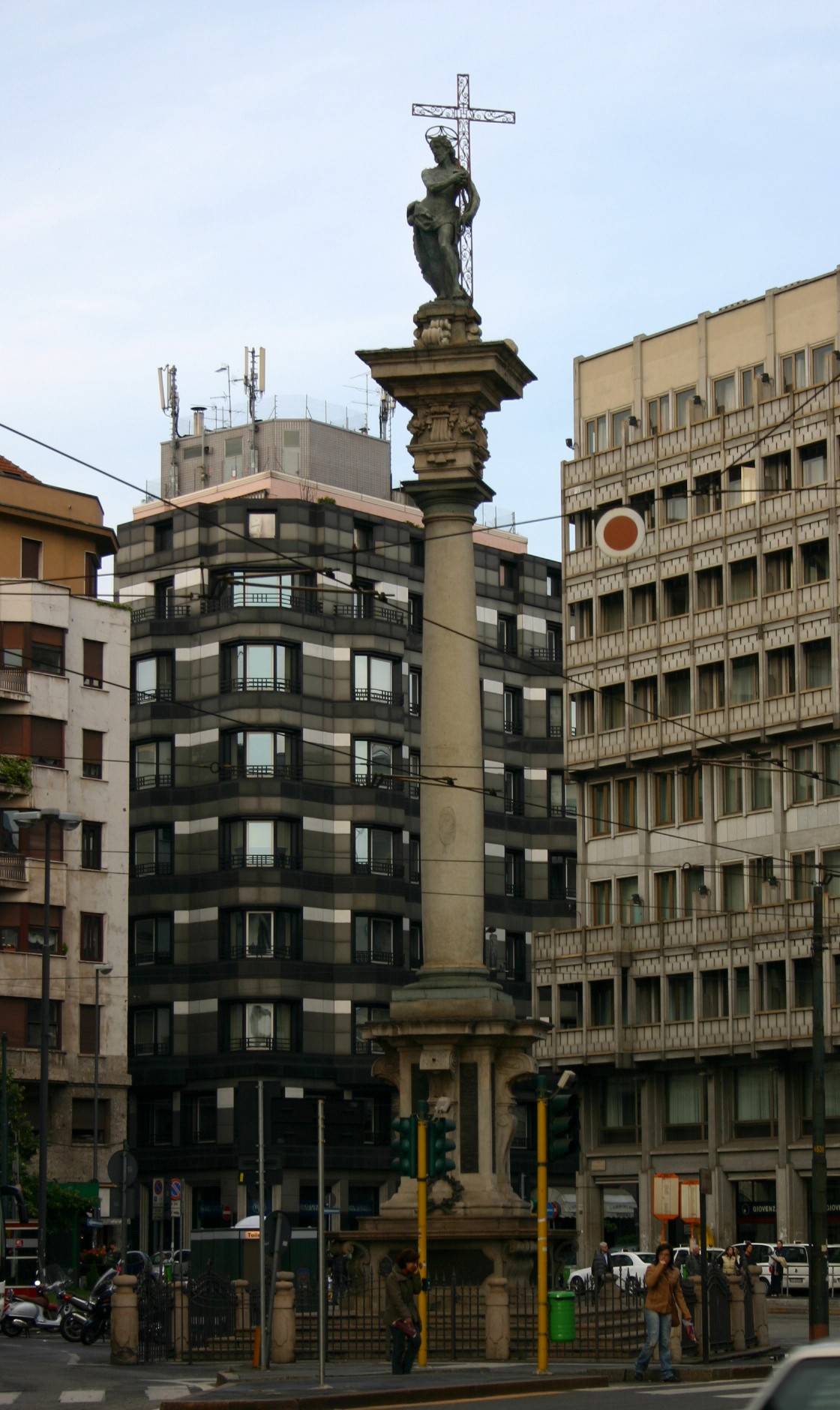
The Verziere Column in Largo Augusto

The Verziere (old-fashioned Italian word for "greengrocery market"; also known as Verzee, in Milanese) was the traditional greengrocery street market of Milan, Italy. The market itself has been relocated several times, and it is now in Via Lombroso, east of the city centre; the word "Verziere", anyway, still refers to the main historic location of the market, where it was held from 1776 century until 1911. The new greengrocery market of Via Lombroso is more properly referred to as "Ortomercato" (another Italian word with the same meaning) or "Mercati Generali" ("general markets").

The "Verziere" area has been a symbol of Milan, and notable Milanese scholars such as Carlo Porta and Carlo Maria Maggi celebrated the Verziere in their works as the place where both the Milanese dialect and the Milanese culture was represented in their purest form.

== History ==
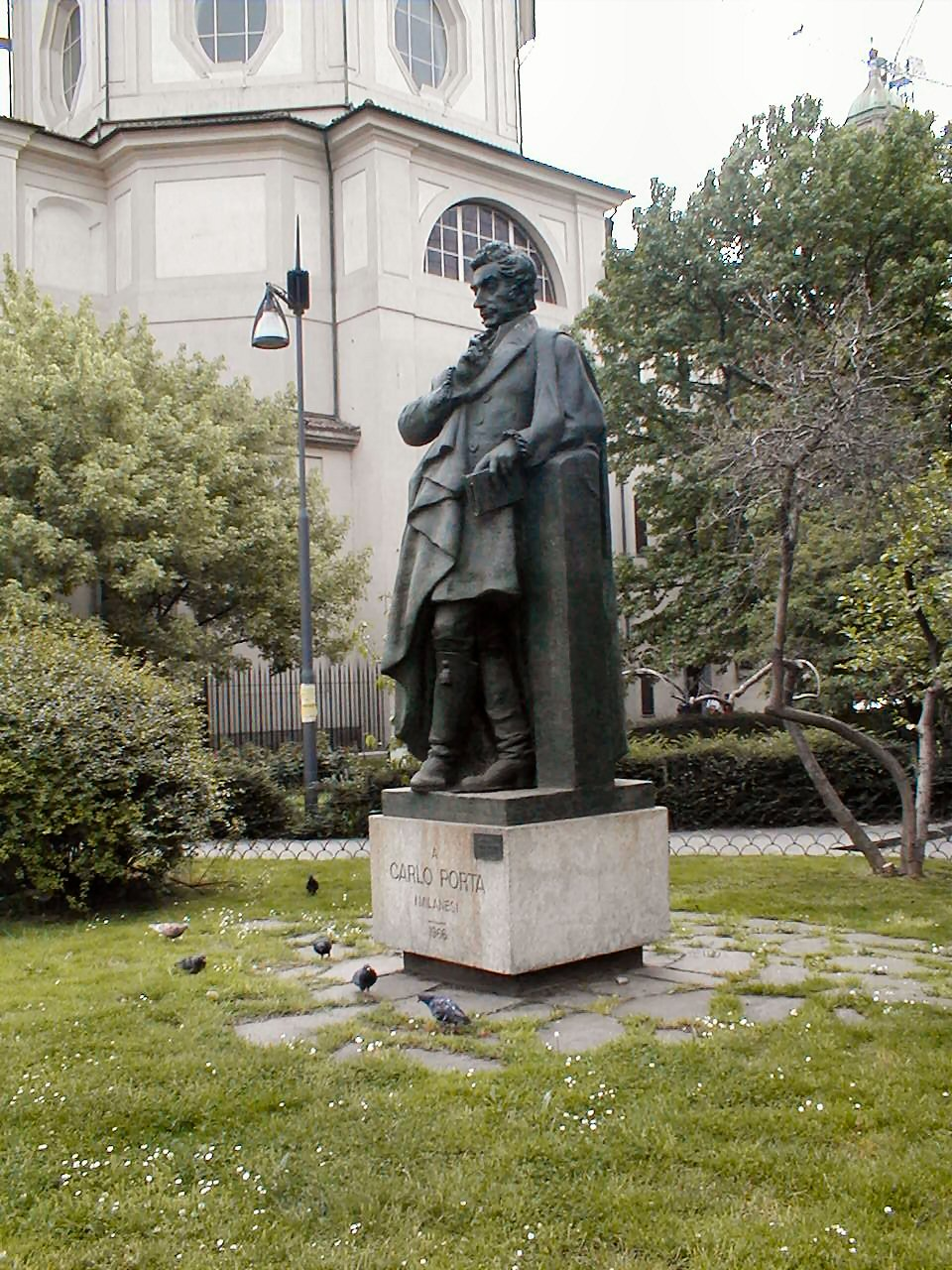
Statue of Carlo Porta in Piazza Santo Stefano

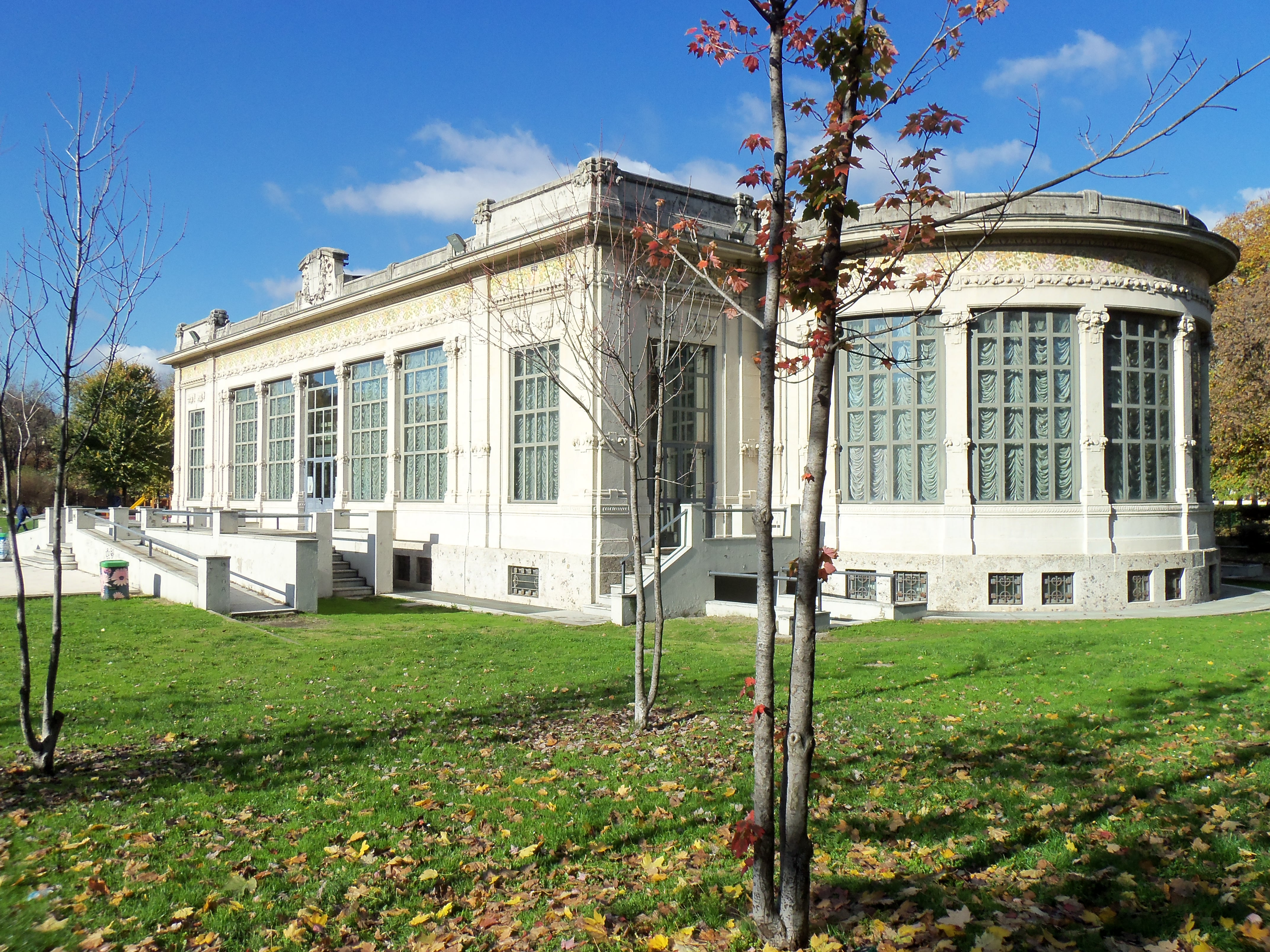
The "Palazzina Liberty" in Parco Marinai d'Italia

The first Verzee was probably held in the main plaza of Milan, Piazza del Duomo, until the early 16th century, when it was relocated in the context of a thorough urban reorganization dictated by the municipal authorities. The market was thus relocated to what is now Piazza Fontana, a prominent square adjacent to the Duomo, where the Palace of the Archbishop ("Palazzo dell'Arcivescovado" in Italian) is also located. The 18th century scholar Carlo Torre mentions the Verziere in his essay Il ritratto di Milano ("Portrait of Milan", 1714), reporting that the area used to be a "wonderful garden". The market was then moved from Piazza Fontana to the nearby Piazza Santo Stefano and then (in 1776) to its best known historic location in Largo Augusto.

Until the late 19th century, the Verziere could be reached by boat through Milan's canal system, which included a small port in an artificial inlet called "Laghetto" ("small lake"). The lake (as well as most of Milan's canals) has since been filled-in, but it is recalled in some toponymys, most notably "Via del Laghetto" ("Small Lake Street").

Between the late 16th century and the late 17th century, a votive monumental column, called Colonna del Verziere, was erected in what was the centre of the market.

The market was moved in 1911 to the surroundings of Porta Vittoria, where it remained until 1965. In this less central setting, the Verziere could be expanded. Several buildings were realized for the market, most of which were later demolished; the most notable remnant of this incarnation of the Verziere is the "Palazzina Liberty" bordering the Marinai d'Italia City Park, an Art Nouveau building designed in 1908 by architect Alberto Migliorini and that, over time, has hosted cultural events and has been used as the headquarters of Dario Fo's theatrical company.

In 1965 the market was finally moved to its current location in Via Lombroso.

In 1966, a statue of poet Carlo Porta, realized by Ivo Sioli, was placed in the old Verziere location of Piazza Santo Stefano. The statue is usually referred to as "Carlo Porta al Verzee" ("Carlo Porta by the Verziere").

== The witches of the Verziere ==
While the Verziere was celebrated as the "heart" of Milan by several poets and writers, it also had the reputation of being an unsafe district, populated by thieves, prostitutes, and tencitt (in Milanese, meaning "black stained people", in reference to the darsena workers who transported coal and wood). The darsena itself was so polluted that Franz Joseph I of Austria, in 1857, ordered that it be filled in for hygienical reasons. Moreover, witches were believed to inhabit the district; their elder was known to live on the second floor of the "Cà dei Tencitt" ("House of the tencitt") building, in what is now Via Laghetto. In fact, the Verziere Column, topped with a cross and a statue of Jesus Christ the Redeemer, was said to be erected as both a votive column and with the purpose of opposing the malicious power of the "Verziere Witches".
