= Verziere Column =

Monumental column in Milan, Italy

Coordinates: 45.4632°N 9.1973°E

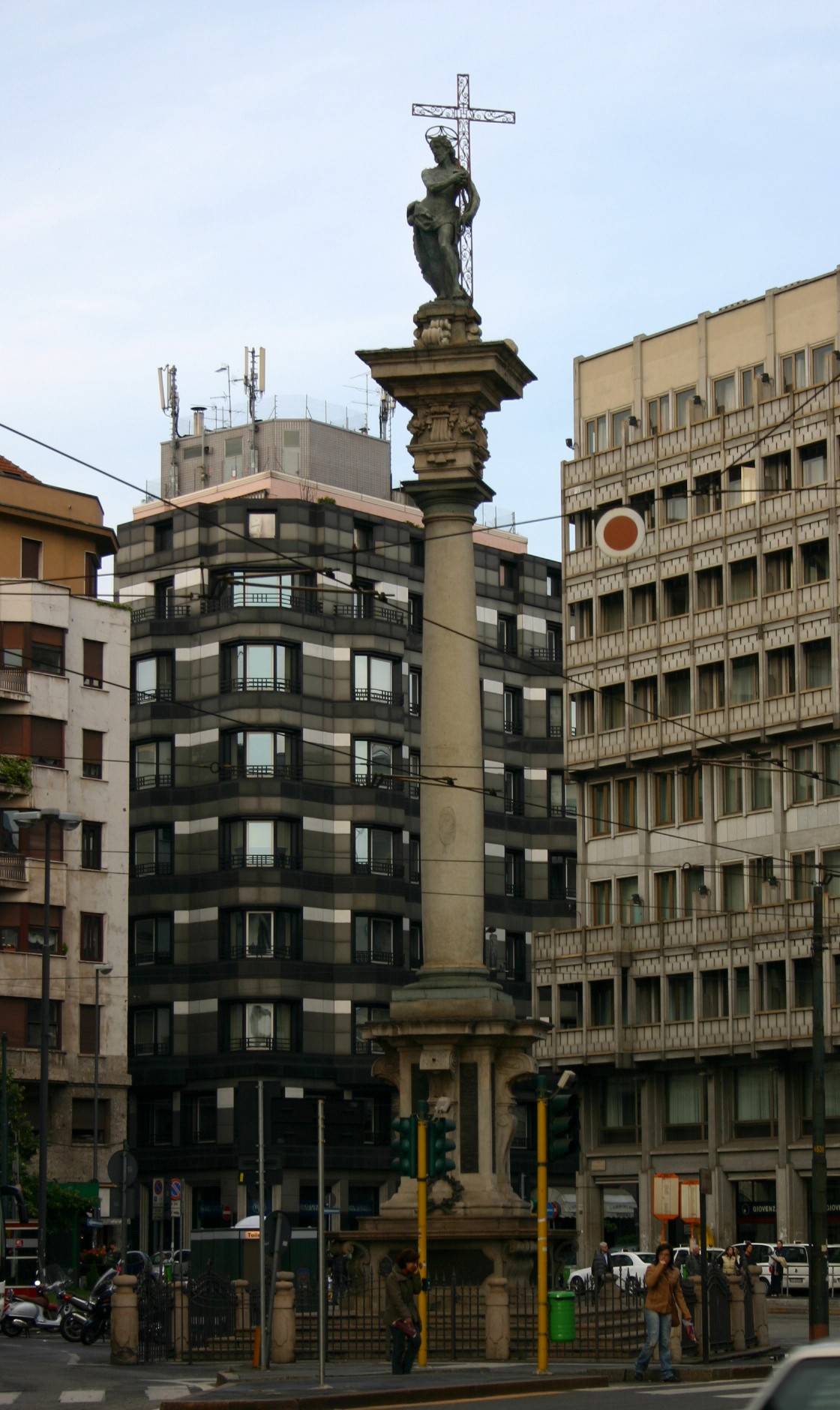
The Verziere Column (2007)

The Verziere Column (in Italian: Colonna del Verziere) is a baroque-manneristic monumental column dedicated to "Jesus Christ the Redeemer", in Milan, Italy. The column is located in Largo Augusto and it is named after the "Verziere", the traditional greengrocery street market of Milan that, until 1783, was located in the surrounding district. The construction of the column began in 1580, but it was only completed in 1673.

While the column was originally intended as a votive, religious monument, after the unification of Italy it was repurposed as a monument to commemorate the martyrs who died during the Five Days of Milan. Bronze plaques on the pedestal were added, bearing the names of 354 Milanese that were killed in the riots.

The top of the column has a statue of "Christ the Redemeer" ("Cristo Redentore" in Italian) that was realized by Giuseppe and Gian Battista Vismara, and installed by the Milanese architect Francesco Maria Richini.

== History ==
The construction of the column was ordered by the "Confraternity of the Sacred Cross of Porta Tosa", a Milanese religious order which had its headquarters in the area. The purpose of the column was twofold; it was meant both a votive offering to celebrate the end of the epidemic of plague that occurred in Milan in 1576-1577, and as a symbol of the power of Christianity to be opposed to the malicious power of the witches that were believed to inhabit the neighbourhood. The column itself was built in Baveno and brought to Milan by boat; at the time, the Verziere itself could be reached by boat through Milan's canal system.

The column was first completed in 1583, but legal and bureaucratic problems followed; the column was demolished, and the reconstruction had several false starts, so that the completion was eventually delayed until 1611. Also because of bureaucratic issues, the statue of Jesus Christ could not be placed on top of the column until 1673.

== The column in Milanese folklore ==
As a consequence of the fact that the old Verziere was traditionally associated with witchcraft and magic, and of the slowness of the building works of the column, the column itself has a "haunted" reputation in Milanese folklore. A traditional story has it that the statue of Jesus Christ was originally facing towards the Verziere (which is not the direction it is facing now) and that Christ turned its head when a girl named "Barbarinetta" committed suicide by leaping off a balcony in the Verziere plaza.
