= Colonna di San Zanobi, Florence =

Column in Florence, Italy

Colonna di San Zanobi
- Column of Saint Zanobi
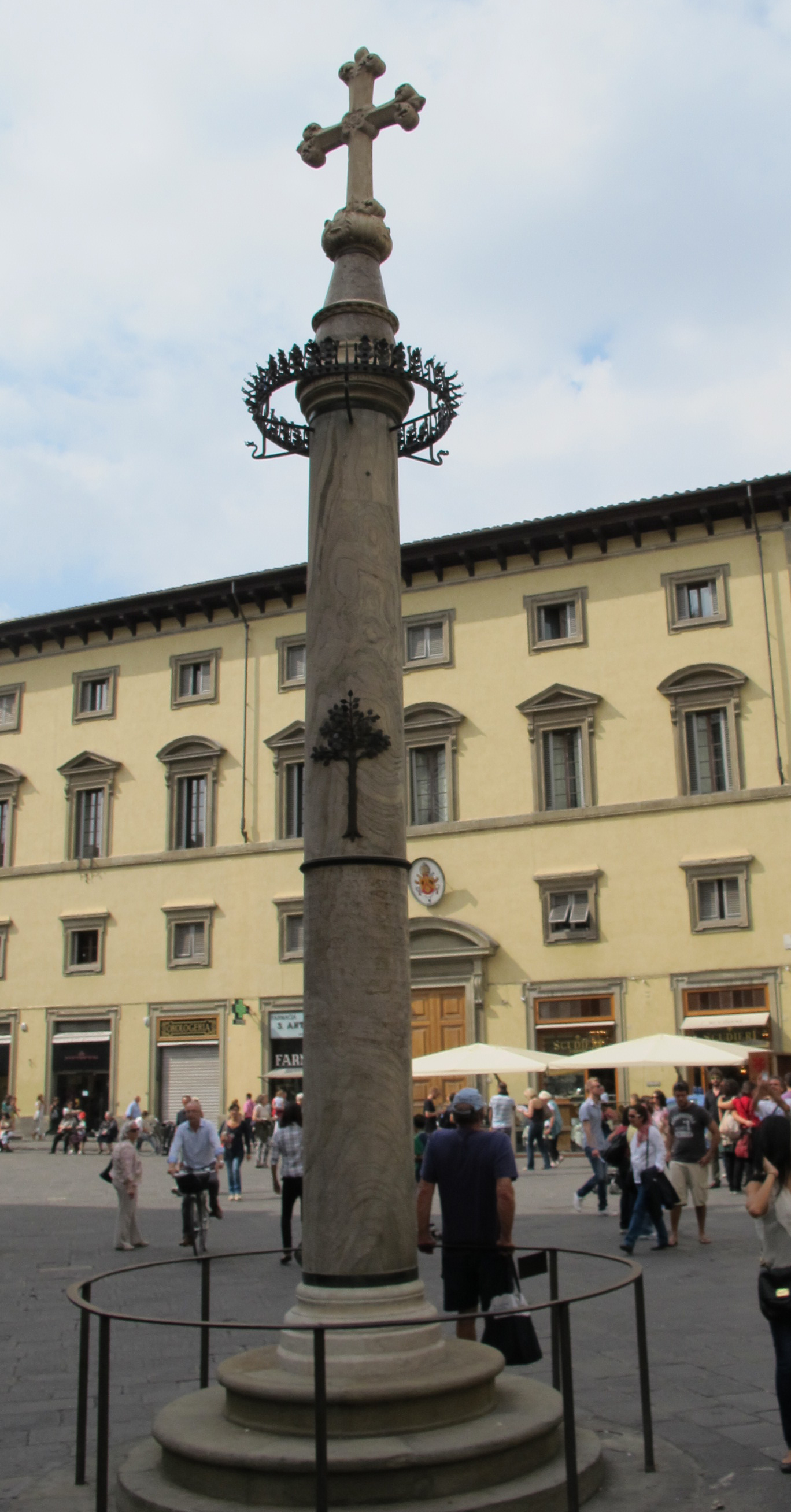
- Column of Saint Zanobi in Piazza San Giovanni

- Location within Florence Location within Italy
- Interactive map of Colonna di San Zanobi
- Location: Piazza San Giovanni; Florence, Italy
- Coordinates: 43.7733°N 11.2550°E
- Type: Monumental column
- Material: Marble, granite, metal (tree and cross)
- Completion date: c.1334
- Dedicated date: Saint Zanobi
- Restored date: Late 1990s; 2012
- Owner: Municipality of Florence

The Column of Saint Zanobi (it:Colonna di San Zanobi) is a monumental marble column, surmounted by a cross above a crown of fire, located just north of the Baptistery of San Giovanni in Florence, Italy.

== Description ==
The column was placed to memorialize a miracle by the former Florentine Bishop, who had died in circa 430. In the 9th-century, San Zenobi's remains, held in an urn, were being transferred from the church of San Lorenzo to the then Cathedral of Santa Reparata. The move was prompted because San Lorenzo at the time was outside the city walls, and the region was threatened by the Hungarian invasions. As the remains were being moved, tradition holds they brushed against an elm tree in winter, that proceeded to become leafy. The column marks where the elm tree stood. It is not known when the column was erected, but it was in place by the year 1333. The column has a metal tree image affixed.
