= Column of Marcus Aurelius =

Ancient Roman victory column, a landmark of Rome, Italy

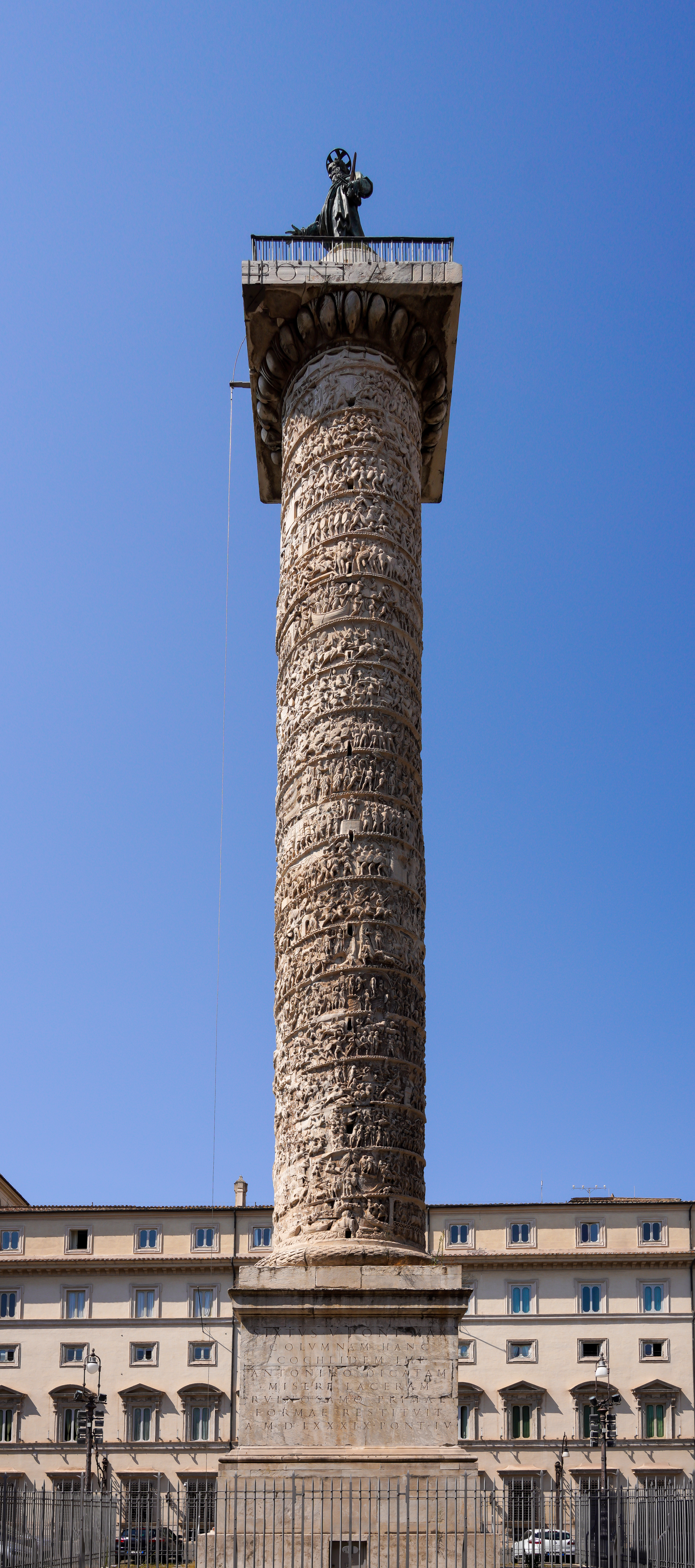
- The Column of Marcus Aurelius in Piazza Colonna
- Click on the map for a fullscreen view
- Coordinates: 41°54′03″N 12°28′48″E

The Column of Marcus Aurelius (Latin: Columna Centenaria Divorum Marci et Faustinae, Italian: Colonna di Marco Aurelio) is a Roman victory column located in Piazza Colonna, Rome, Italy. A Doric column adorned with a detailed spiral relief, it was built in honor of Roman emperor Marcus Aurelius and modeled after Trajan's Column. Dedicated to the emperor and his military campaigns during the Barbarian Wars, the monument stands as a testament to his reign from 161 to 180 AD. The column's frieze, approximately 367 feet (112 meters) long, spirals upward 21 times, depicting the emperor’s campaigns against the Germanic and Sarmatian tribes. Its construction likely began after his death in 180 AD and was completed around 193 AD, under the reign of Septimius Severus.

== Location ==
Throughout its history, the Column of Marcus Aurelius has remained in the same location. The column was in the northern part of the Campus Martius, located on Via Flaminia, an ancient Roman road, that leads in and out of the city. Today, the column is located in the Piazza Colonna in Rome and is central to the geography of mapping of the city. The location of the Piazza Colonna is in the Northern sector at the heart of the city. Though the completion of the Column wasn’t until 193 AD, after the Barbarian wars and the death of Marcus Aurelius, it was still placed where the public and Roman soldiers could draw strength and pride.

== Characteristics ==
The column's shaft is 29.6 metres (97 ft) high, on a 10.1 metres (33 ft) high base, which in turn originally stood on a 3 metres (9.8 ft) high platform – the column in total is 39.7 metres (130 ft).

The column consists of 27 or 28 blocks of Carrara marble imported from the ancient quarry of Luna north of Pisa, Italy. Each marble blocks of 3.7 metres (12 ft) diameter, hollowed out while still at the quarry for a stairway of 190–200 steps within the column up to a platform at the top. Just as with Trajan's Column, this stairway is illuminated through narrow slits into the relief.

=== Design ===
Nicknamed the Columna Centenaria, by contemporary Romans, and Columna Cochlis (snail column), because of the size of the monument, commonly referred to it by its size, because of it enormity, the Column of Trajan was nicknamed the same way. The column is made of white Italian Carrara marble, brought from Northern Rome for the monument. Constructed in a Doric style, which refers mostly to the shape of the cap of the monument before the placement of the statue on top. The statue on top of the monument is probably a Roman tradition dating back to the 4th century BCE. The pedestal is made up of large rectangular blocks, with an inscription around the base, a Column with a frieze of the Germanic war north of the Danube, and originally had a bronze statue of the emperor Marcus Aurelius, which was then replaced with that of St. Paul in the 16th century. The Column's shaft is made up of 17 marble drums that were carved and stacked to shape, then the frieze was carved in after the monument was standing.

=== Relief ===
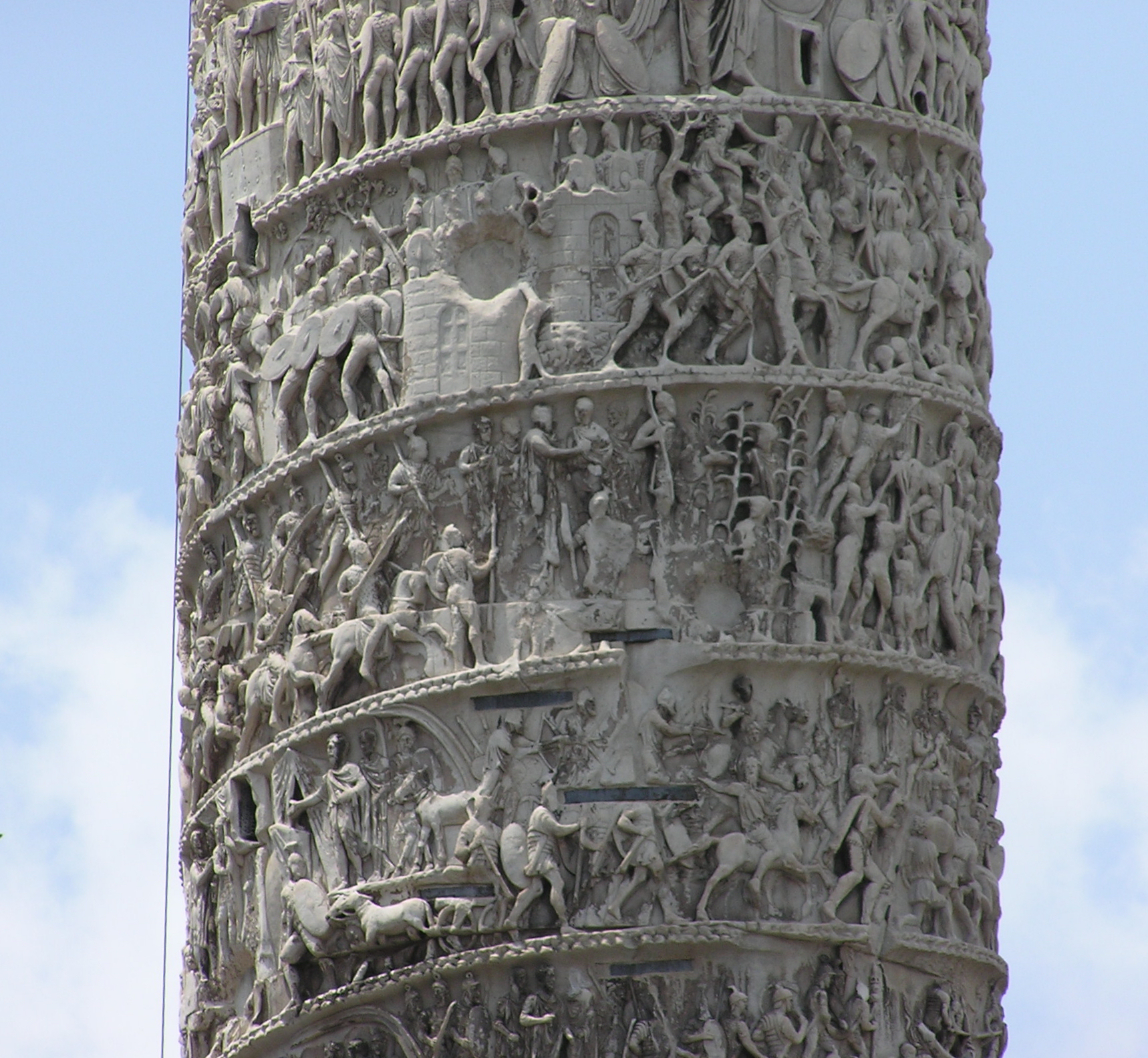
Detail from the column. The five horizontal slits (visible in the larger version) allow light into the internal stairway.

The spiral picture relief tells the story of Marcus Aurelius' Danubian or Marcomannic Wars, waged by him from 169 to his death. The story begins with the army crossing the River Danube into the modern day Czech Republic and Hungary. While commonly interpreted as a depiction of the major campaigns during the Marcomannic Wars, the chronological order is still disputed among scholars today.

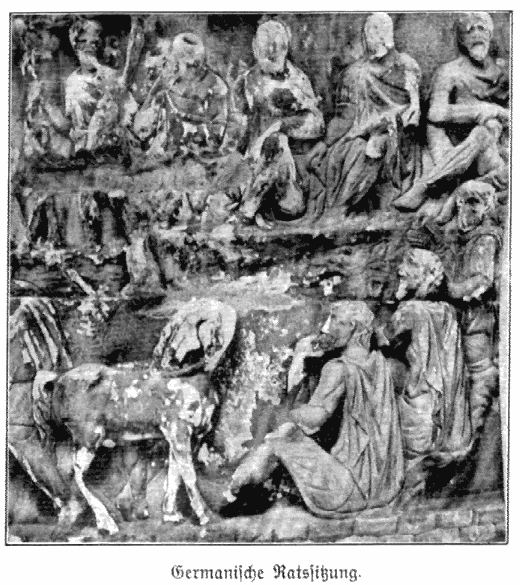
German council of war depicted on the column – considered early evidence of what would become known as the Thing (assembly)

One particular episode portrayed is historically attested in Roman propaganda – the so-called "rain miracle in the territory of the Quadi", in which a god, answering a prayer from the emperor, rescues Roman troops by a terrible storm, a miracle later claimed by the Christians for the Christian God.

As seen in the images, the figures' heads are disproportionately large so that the viewer can better interpret their facial expressions from a distance. The images are carved less finely than on Trajan's Column, through drilling holes more deeply into the stone, creating a stronger contrast of light and dark. As villages are burned down, women and children are captured and displaced and men are killed. The emotion, despair, and suffering of the "barbarians" in the war, are represented acutely in single scenes and in the figures' facial expressions and gestures, whilst the emperor is represented as the protagonist, in control of his environment.

The symbolic language is altogether clearer and more expressive, if clumsier at first sight, in comparison to the artistic style of 100 to 150 CE as seen on Trajan's Column, and it leaves a different impression on the viewer of drama. The pictorial language is unambiguous – imperial dominance and authority is emphasized, and its leadership is justified. Overall, it is an anticipation of the development of artistic style into late antiquity, and a first artistic expression of the crisis of the Roman empire that would worsen in the 3rd century.

=== Miracle Rain ===
The scene miracle rain is one of the most important scenes on the monument. There is religious debate and symbolism found with this scene. Cassius Dio, a famous Roman historian, describes the scene:

The Quadi had surrounded them at a spot favorable for their purpose and the Romans were fighting valiantly with their shields locked together; then the barbarians ceased fighting, expecting to capture them easily as the result of the heat and their thirst. So they posted guards all about and hemmed them in to prevent them from getting water anywhere; for the barbarians were far superior in numbers. The Romans, accordingly, were in a terrible plight from fatigue, wounds, the heat of the sun, and thirst, and so could neither fight nor retreat, but were standing in the line and at the several posts, scorched by the heat, when suddenly many clouds gathered and a mighty rain, not without divine interposition, burst upon them. Indeed, there is a story to the effect that Harnuphis, an Egyptian magician, who was a companion of Marcus, had invoked by means of enchantments various deities and in particular Mercury, the god of the air, and by this means attracted the rain...When the rain poured down, at first all turned their faces upwards and received the water in their mouths; then some held out their shields and some their helmets to catch it, and they drank and fought at the same time; and some becoming wounded, actually gulped down the blood that flowed into their helmets along with the water. So intent indeed, were most of them on drinking that they would have suffered severely from the enemy’s onset, had not a violent rainstorm and numerous thunderbolts fallen upon the ranks of the foe. Thus in one and the same place one might have beheld water and fire descending from the sky simultaneously; so that while those on the one side were being drenched and drinking, the others were being consumed by fire and dying; and while the fire, on the one hand did not touch the Romans, but, If it fell anywhere among them, was immediate extinguished, the rain however on the other hand, did the barbarians no good, but, like so much oil, actually fed the flames that were consuming them, and they had to search for water even while being drenched with rain. Some wounded themselves in order to quench the fire with their blood, and others rushed over to the side of the Romans, convinced that they alone had the saving water; in any case Marcus took pity on them. He was now saluted imperator by the soldiers, for the seventh time; and although he was not wont to accept any such honor before the senate voted it, nevertheless this time he took it as a gift from heaven, and he sent a dispatch to the senate. (Dio 72.8.1–3 and 72.10.1–5, trans E Cary.)

This was a representation at the beginning, a defining moment in Marcus Aurelius’ campaigns, the miracle rain did happen earlier on in the timeline of the northern campaigns and gave Romans the idea that it was their divine right to ward off barbarianism.

== History ==
=== Context ===
Marcus Aurelius is commemorated as being the last of the Five Good Emperors. These were emperors between the years 96AD-180AD, a time of semi-peaceful borders, prosperous growth, and a stable government with leaders with a desire to serve. The Roman Empire at the time was at the height of its influence and its borders spread far across modern Asia, Europe, and Africa. The Roman Empire spanned from Britain to Syria, all of Europe south of the Danube and Rhine Rivers and Africa north of the Sahara Desert.

Marcus Aurelius was revered as a stoic and wise emperor. His reign is known best for his strategic, political and militaristic decisions. Despite growing up wealthy and in favor with the emperor’s family, he didn’t attain a more selfish attitude but instead developed a mentality to serve for the betterment of his empire.

The Monument was erected by Commodus, the son of Marcus Aurelius’ and Co-emperor since 166AD, a tradition in Roman life was that they were indebted to their predecessors. The only forerunner to the Column of Marcus Aurelius is the Column of Trajan, elements of which were directly incorporated into Marcus Aurelius’ Column, thereby providing a direct link between the families of Marcus Aurelius’ and Trajan. The Column of Marcus Aurelius’ is taller and carved deeper. This demonstrates Commodus’s drive to raise his family to the top of Roman society and to ensure that his father’s reign—and later his own reign—was respected.

=== Planning ===
Much information about the construction of this Monument has been lost. The initial idea of the column likely originated from the Roman Senate, likely to compare Marcus Aurelius to Trajan. The initial decree included the type of monument, material, location, inscription, and statue. Then architects were summoned, they presented their designs and then the best design would be used.

The Column of Marcus Aurelius takes inspiration from the Column of Trajan, although the entirety of the frieze wasn’t designed when construction began. The frieze, the internal staircase, and its style of architecture are a near complete copy of the Column of Trajan; however, the carvings are deeper and more detailed.

=== Construction ===
The monument was created in honor of Marcus Aurelius by his son, the Emperor Commodus, and the Senate of Rome, to commemorate his victories against the Germanic tribes. The Column of Marcus Aurelius was designed in the Doric style, which is an ancient Greek and Roman style of architecture that signified strength and dignity, its strong, firm, and simple design. Since there isn’t a lot of evidence of the actual construction of the Column of Marcus Aurelius, a lot of the existence and development of the Column is based on interpretation. The basis for the design of the Column of Marcus Aurelius, comes from the Column of Trajan. Both are imperial Roman monuments in Doric style and contain a frieze throughout the center column of the monument; however, the Column of Marcus Aurelius was carved deeper than the Trajan column, making the carving more prevalent and details more obvious. The monument is located in the Piazza Colonna in Rome and was erected in around the year 180 CE. The monument is made of white Carrera Marble and is about 175 Roman feet tall. It consists of a base with 30 stacked spirals and depicts scenes of Marcus Aurelius fighting barbarianism, spreading Romanism, and philosophizing to his constituents. The sculpture is hollow on the inside. A door at the base provides access to a spiral staircase that leads to a lookout located on the top of the monument.

==== Procurator - Adrastus ====
Not much is known for certain about Adrastus. He was a freedman who was made the Procurator Columnae (Procurator of the Column) of the Column of Marcus Aurelius. He was assigned to the Column of Marcus Aurelius in 193 AD, the commonly accepted date of the completion of the column. There are two inscriptions relating Adrastus with the Column. The first one states that he was assigned as the Procurator of the Column. Given that he was assigned this when the Column was at or near completion, his role would have primarily consisted of being a watchman. The second inscription was a request for land and material in order to construct a home near the column.

== Later history ==
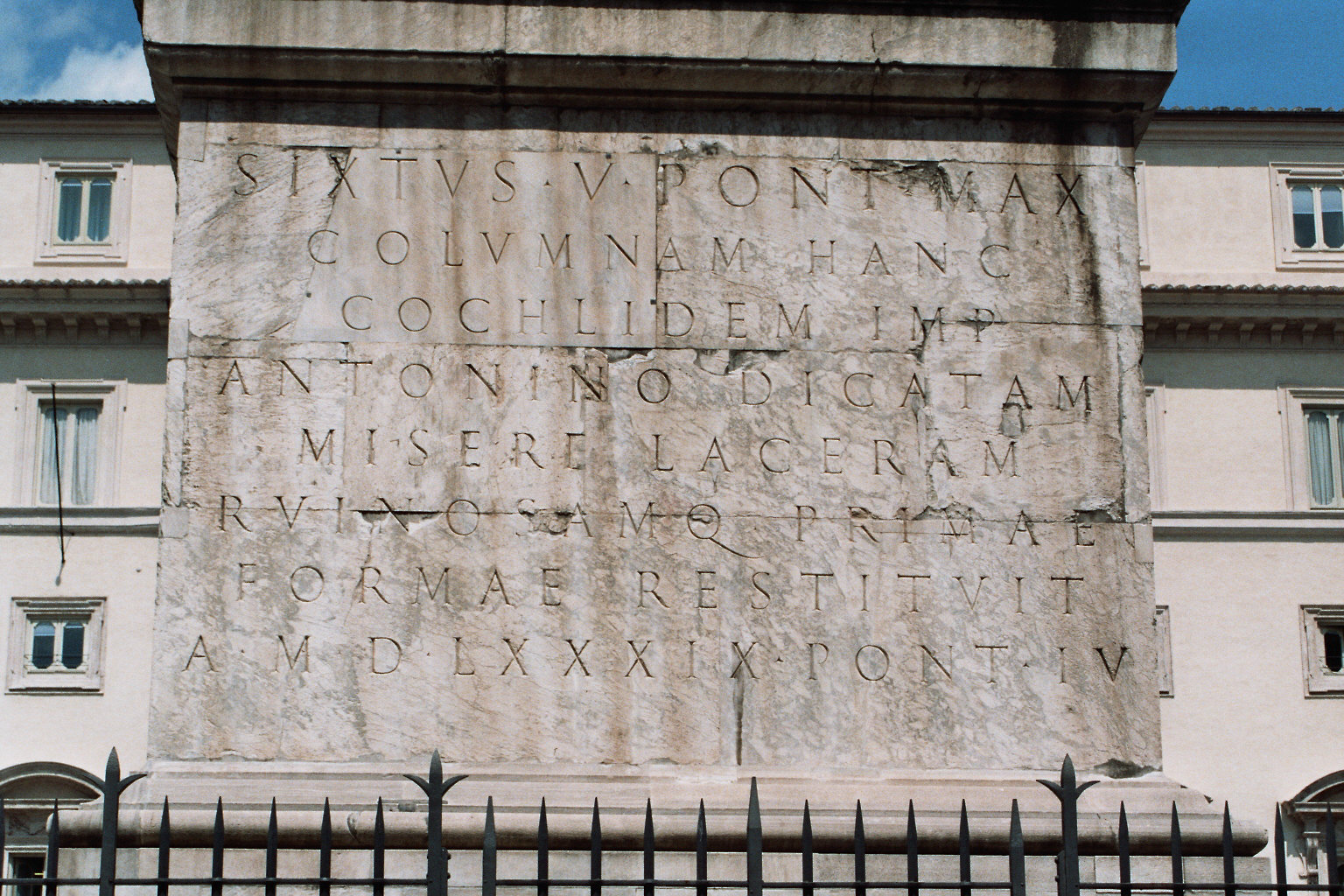
Inscription describing the restoration

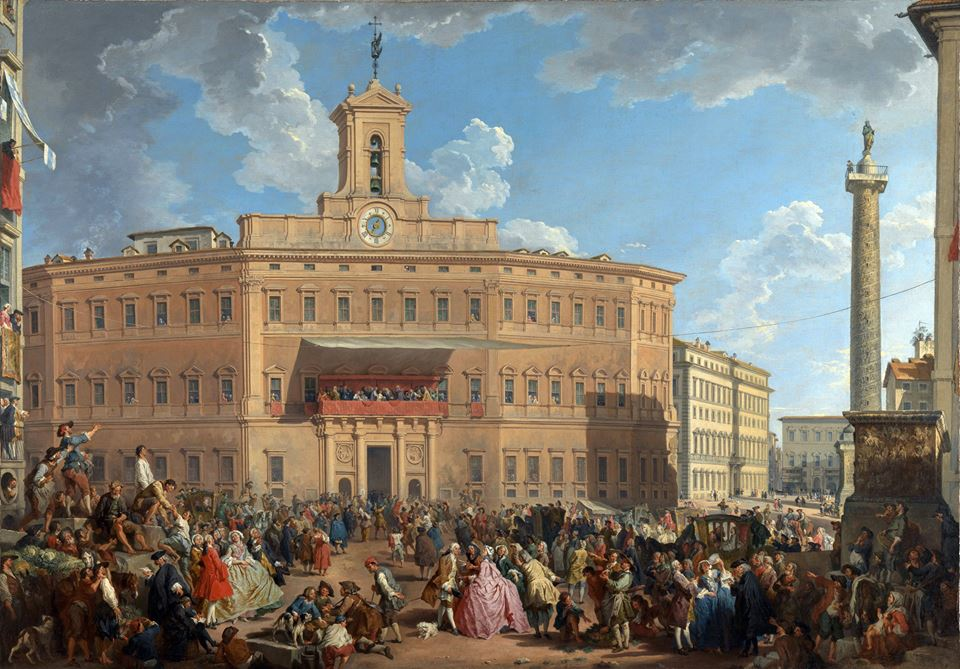
The Lottery in Piazza di Montecitorio. The column (right) in the background of Panini's painting of the Palazzo Montecitorio, with the base of the Column of Antoninus Pius in the right foreground (1747)

=== Restoration of 1589 ===
By the mid-sixteenth century, the Column's pedestal had suffered substantial burial and decay. About six metres of the column (including the original spiral-stair entrance) lay beneath the rising ground level, the emperor's bronze statue at the summit had long vanished, cracks pervaded the marble, and a fragment of the capital was missing.

In 1589, Pope Sixtus V commissioned architect Domenico Fontana to restore the monument. Fontana excavated the base down to the contemporary ground level (leaving the platform and 3m of the base covered), sealed cracks, and crowned the capital with a new bronze statue of St. Paul modeled on Trajan's Column's St. Peter. He also created a new entrance to the spiral staircase at ground level to replace the one that had been buried.

Originally, the pedestal bore reliefs of garland-bearing victories on three sides and subdued barbarians on the side facing the Via Flaminia. During Fontana's works, these were chiseled away, and the superstructure encased in marble. The marble casing carries Latin inscriptions, one of which misidentifies the monument as the Column of Antoninus Pius.

==== Latin Inscriptions ====
SIXTVS V PONT MAX	Sixtus V High Priest (or Supreme Pontiff),
COLVMNAM HANC	this column,
COCHLIDEM IMP	which is spiral, to the emperor
ANTONINO DICATAM	Antoninus dedicated,
MISERE LACERAM	sadly broken
RVINOSAMQ[UE] PRIMAE	and ruinous, into its original
FORMAE RESTITVIT	form restored.
A. MDLXXXIX PONT IV	Year 1589, 4th year of his pontificate.

=== Modern Day ===
Now the Column serves a centerpiece to the Piazza Colonna, in front of the Palazzo Chigi.

== Symbolism ==
=== Connection to Religion ===
The only time the interpretation of the Column was changed was in the sixteenth century, when Pope Pius commissioned Domenico Fontana to restore the frieze and make some changes along with it. For one the base the column sat on was changed out due to damage from an earthquake. And when it was replaced, it was changed with new inscriptions on the base, stating the columns new representation, as a ward off of barbarianism because of the church and commemoration to St. Paul, when they replaced the statue of Marcus Aurelius with one of St. Paul. This isn’t the only depiction of divinity on the Column, the frieze itself contains scenes that depict divinity being a presence in the scene “Miracle Rain”, where it seems the holy spirit is descending upon them.

== Historical Significance ==
The significance of the monument is that it is a vital depiction of the Marcomannic Wars. The frieze serves as historical evidence on the war with Barbarianism given its depictions of the barbarians and the Romans on the relief. The war with barbarianism was a prevalent part of the reign of Marcus Aurelius.

The significance of the monument can also be seen with its preservation throughout history. It survived the Middle Ages and then was preserved and renovated by Pope Sixtus V in 1589. This demonstrates the citizens of Rome held it, and still hold it to a great value.

== Dimensions ==
- Height of base: 1.58 metres (5 ft 2 in)
- + Height of shaft: 26.49 metres (86.9 ft)
  - Typical height of drums: 1.56 metres (5 ft 1 in)
  - Diameter of shaft: 3.48 metres (11.4 ft)
- + Height of capital: 1.55 metres (5 ft 1 in)
- = Height of column proper: 29.62 metres (97.2 ft) (~ 100 Roman feet)
- + Height of pedestal: ~ 10.1 metres (33 ft)
- = Height of top of column above ground: ~ 39.72 metres (130.3 ft)

== See also ==
- Column of Phocas – Ancient Roman triumphal column, a landmark of Rome, Italy
- Trajan's Market – Ancient Roman city architecture, a landmark of Rome, Italy
- List of ancient spiral stairs
- Ancient Roman architecture

== Bibliography ==
- Beckmann, Martin (2011). The Column of Marcus Aurelius. The Genesis and Meaning of a Roman Imperial Monument. Chapel Hill: University of North Carolina Press. ISBN 978-0-8078-3461-9.
- Beckmann, Martin (2002). "The 'Columnae Coc(h)lides' of Trajan and Marcus Aurelius". Phoenix. 56 (3/4). Classical Association of Canada: 348–357. doi:10.2307/1192605. JSTOR 1192605.
- Birley, A. R. 2000. “Hadrian to the Antonines” In A. Bowman, P. Garnsey, and D Rathbone (eds.), The Cambridge Ancient History, vol. 11.
- Birley, A.R. 2002. Review of Scheid and Huet 2000. L'Antiquité Classique 71: 504–6.
- Birley, Anthony R., and Martin Beckmann. L'Antiquité Classique 82 (2013): 672–74.
- Caprino, C.; A. M. Colini; G. Gatti; M. Pallottino; P. Romanelli (1955). La Colonna di Marco Aurelio. Rome: L'Erma di Bretschneider.
- Coarelli, F. (2008). La Colonna di Marco Aurelio – The Column of Marcus Aurelius. Rome: Colomba.
- Davis, Peneople J. E., Death and The Emperor. Roman Imperial Funerary Monuments from Augustus to Marcus Aurelius. University of Texas Press, Austin, 2004.
- Griebel, Johannes (2013). Der Kaiser im Krieg. Die Bilder der Säule des Marc Aurel (in German). Berlin: Walter de Gruyter.
- Ferris, Iain (2009). Hate and War: The Column of Marcus Aurelius. Stroud (Gloucestershire): The History Press.
- Jones, Mark Wilson (2000). Principles of Roman Architecture. Yale University Press. ISBN 0-300-08138-3.
- Jordan, H. 1871-1907. Topographie der Stadt Rom im Alterthum. 2 vols. In four parts. Berlin: Weidmannsche Buchhandlung.
- Moore, Daniel W. “A Note on CIL VI.1585a-b and the Role of Adrastus, Procurator of the Column of Marcus Aurelius.” Zeitschrift für Papyrologie und Epigraphik 181 (2012): 221–29.
- Rendina, Claudio (2000). Enciclopedia di Roma. Rome: Newton & Compton.
- Scheid, J.; V. Huet (2000). Autour de la colonne Aurélienne. Turnhout: Brepols.
- Thill, Elizabeth Wolfram. “Setting War in Stone: Architectural Depictions on the Column of Marcus Aurelius.” American Journal of Archaeology 122, no. 2 (2018)

Preceded by Column of Antoninus Pius	Landmarks of Rome; Column of Marcus Aurelius	Succeeded by Column of Phocas
