= 14 regions of Constantinople =

Regions of Constantinople

Map of the regions of Byzantine Constantinople.

The ancient city of Constantinople was divided into 14 administrative regions (Latin: regiones, Greek: συνοικιες, romanized: synoikies). The system of fourteen regiones was modelled on the fourteen regiones of Rome, a system introduced by the first Roman emperor Augustus in the 1st century AD.

After Emperor Constantine the Great re-founded Byzantium as Constantinople and Nova Roma ('New Rome') in the early 4th century, he or his immediate successors divided Constantinople into its own 14 regiones. Each region (regio) was numbered, and their boundaries and landmarks in the 5th century were enumerated by the Notitia Urbis Constantinopolitanae, which also gives details of the city's Cura Annonae, the public grain ration which was distributed by regio. Two regiones, XIII and XIV, were outside the original city walls.

== The 14 regions ==
=== Regio I ===
The area of the I^{st} regio was defined by the Great Palace, which lay within it, the southeastern edge of Hippodrome, the Byzantine acropolis, and the sea (the Propontis). Here, besides the Great Palace, there were a number of palatial buildings named by the Notitia Urbis Constantinopolitanae: there was the Palace of Placidia, (Palatium Placidianum) connected with a daughter of Valentinian I, and a House of Galla Placidia (Domus Placidiae Augustae), associated with the augusta Galla Placidia, daughter of Theodosius I and husband of first Athaulf and then Constantius III. A House of the Nobilissima Marina (Domum nobilissimae Marinae) was probably named for Marina, a daughter of Galla Placidia's brother Arcadius augustus, who himself gave his name to the Baths of Arcadius, (Thermas Arcadianas) described by Procopius.

=== Regio II ===
The II^{nd} regio was the site of Hagia Sophia and Hagia Irene, which the Notitia calls the Magna Ecclesia, 'Great Church' and the Ecclesia Antiqua, 'Old Church', a court-house, and the huge Baths of Zeuxippus. These thermae were on the southern side of the Augustaion square and extended as far as the northern edge of the Hippodrome and the Great Palace. On the eastern edge of the Augustaion beside Hagia Sophia was a senate-house for the Byzantine Senate, (to be distinguished from the senate-house in the Forum of Constantine) which is mentioned in the Chronicon Paschale and by Procopius, who called it a bouleuterion (Ancient Greek: βουλευτήριον). Though the II^{nd} regio encompassed buildings on three of the Augustaion's four sides, the square itself was counted in the IV^{th} regio. East of the Augustaion and downhill from Hagia Sophia and Hagia Irene was the classical theatre (Latin: Theatrum Minus, lit. 'lesser theatre'). Near the old Byzantine acropolis was the amphitheatre (Latin: Theatrum Maius, lit. 'greater theatre'), known also as the Cynegion (Ancient Greek: Κυνήγιον) and which was probably eastward of the acropolis, near the site of the kitchens of the Topkapı Palace. Both theatre and amphitheatre pre-existed Constantine's re-foundation of the city.

=== Regio III ===
The III^{rd} regio was largely filled with the large circus, called the Hippodrome, which was Constantinople's equivalent of the Circus Maximus in Rome. Its southern edge was the harbour that Zosimus called the "harbour of Julian", otherwise known as the Kontoskalion. Its northern limit was marked by the first stretch of the Mese odos - the main city thoroughfare running east–west - from its origin at the Milion to the Forum of Constantine. It apparently included a tribune on the southern edge of that forum, which itself lay at the junction of regiones VI, VII, and VIII. There was also the semi-circular colonnaded area known as the Sigma, which Zosimus likewise attributed to Julian. The Cistern of Philoxenos was located there, as was the later Justinianic Church of Saints Sergius and Bacchus, and a residence named for the augusta Pulcheria (Domum Pulcheriae Augustae).

=== Regio IV ===
The IV^{th} regio was the site of the Milion (Μίλλιον), the terminus of the Mese odos and, in emulation of Rome's own Milliarium Aureum ('Golden Milestone'), the milestone to which all road distances in the empire were measured. The Milion was a quadrifrons archway. The IV^{th} regio ranged from the Augustaion, which it included, along the valley northwards to the Golden Horn. On the west-northwestern edge of the Augustaion was a great basilica complex, possibly of Severan date, under which was a huge Justinianic water-storage facility that still survives: the Basilica Cistern. The arrangement resembles the layout of the basilica, forum, tetrapylon, and colonnades at Leptis Magna, which suggests the orientation and basic appearance of this part of the city was determined before Constantine by the building works of the Severan emperors. Near the senate-house of the Augustaion was a sculpted marble galley, a victory monument commemorating a sea-battle. To the north of the acropolis, near the Prosphorion Harbour in the V^{th} regio, as was the stadium, also likely a pre-Constantinian building and no longer used for sports when Procopius alluded to it in the 6th century; Justinian had some guesthouses constructed in its vicinity. The Notitia also mentions a church or martyrium to Saint Menas, and the Scala Timasii, a quay apparently named for the 4th century general Timasius, victor of the Battle of the Frigidus.

=== Regio V ===
The V^{th} regio was a commercial district bounded by the Golden Horn to the north and the Mese odos to the south. The Notitia says of it in the early 5th century: "in this Region are contained the buildings that supply the city with its necessities." The Prosphorion Harbour (Portus Prosphorianus) - the 'import harbour' - was sited there. There were four horrea: the olive oil warehouses (horrea olearia) the Horrea Troadensia, 'Troadensian warehouses', Horrea Valentiaca, 'warehouses of Valens', and the Horrea Constantiaca, 'warehouses of Constantius'. Additionally, there was the Prytaneum and the Strategium, which probably were at the civic heart of old Byzantium. The strategion was probably the agora of the classical city, likely named for the official seat of the strategoi there. In Constantine's city, the Strategium was large area; Theodosius I was able to build a forum complex with a "Theban obelisk" (obeliscus Thebaeus quadrus) within it and leave land to spare in which a market continued to be held; this came to be known as the Lesser Strategion. The Cistern of Theodosius was nearby, and were two thermae named for members of the Theodosian dynasty: the Baths of Honorius and the Baths of Eudocia. The Baths of Eudocia in the Notitia may have been the renamed Baths of Achilles after the marriage of Eudocia to Theodosius II in 421. In the V^{th} regio too was the ultimate terminus of the Via Egnatia, for the Chalcedonian quay was located here, from which ferries transported traffic to Chalcedon to join the road to Nicomedia and the Asian provinces.

=== Regio VI ===
On the shore of the VI^{th} regio were two maritime facilities on the Golden Horn, alongside the V^{th} regio's Prosphorion Harbour. These were the portus - the military harbour - and the naval dockyard, the Neorion Harbour, where modern Bahçekapı is. Both the portus and the Neorion were within the walls of the pre-Constantinian city, since Cassius Dio mentions them in his account of the 3rd century siege of Byzantium by Septimius Severus. Another quay, the Scala Sycena, 'Sycaean stairs', served ferries across the Golden Horn to Sycae (later Galata) in the XIII^{th} regio. In the south of the VI^{th} regio the boundary was marked by the course of the Mese odos until the round Forum of Constantine, much of which was counted as within the VI^{th} regio, including the Constantinian senate-house of the Byzantine Senate on the forum's northern axis and the Column of Constantine at its centre.

=== Regio VII ===
The VII^{th} regio was probably divided from the VI^{th} by the line of the ancient walls of Byzantium; the VI^{th} was within the old circuit, while the VII^{th} had been outside, though the obsolete walls themselves were probably gone before the 5th century. The VII^{th} regio was defined in the north by the Golden Horn and by the Mese odos to its south, running from the Forum of Constantine to the Forum of Theodosius, including the lost c. 50 m monumental Column of Theodosius. With its spiral carvings and its spiral staircase (mentioned by the Notitia) like Trajan's Column, it was very likely the tallest Roman column anywhere. It contained a number of colonnaded streets perpendicular to the Mese odos that lead north–south towards the Golden Horn. The VII^{th} regio had three churches named by the Notitia as the churches of Irene, Anastasia, and Saint Paul of Constantinople. It also names a "Baths of Carosa" (Thermas Carosianas), named for a daughter of Valens.

=== Regio VIII ===
The VIII^{th} regio was among the smallest regiones, and one of only two land-locked regiones (with the XI^{th} regio). It was a long, narrow regio opposite the VII^{th}, and followed the south side of the Mese odos running between the Forum of Constantine and the Forum of Theodosius, extending slightly southward. The Basilica of Theodosius at the Forum was within the VIII^{th} regio; according to George Kedrenos it lay transversely along the length of the southern edge of the Forum, covering a span of 240 Roman feet. The Notitia omits mention of the Arch of Theodosius in this forum, but it stood on its southwestern corner and the Mese must have passed under it there. The regio included the Capitolium of Constantinople.

=== Regio IX ===
Like the regiones on the shore of the Golden Horn, the IX^{th} regio was a commercial quarter on the southern edge of the Byzantine peninsula, with two horrea mentioned by the Notitia. One, the Horreum Alexandrina, likely received imports from Alexandria, from where much of the grain supply came; the other, at the westernmost side of the regio was named for the augustus Theodosius. This Horreum Theodosiana was linked with the large new Harbour of Theodosius in the neighbouring XI^{th} regio. Two churches were listed in this regio by the Notitita, a church of Homonoia and church of Caenopolis (Ancient Greek: Καινόπολις, romanized: new city), which perhaps marked the site of a pre-Constantinian extramural settlement of Byzantium. Caenopolis was close by the Forum of Theodosius; roof tiles from the Basilica there are reported to have blown to Caenopolis during a storm recorded by the Chronicon Paschale. The Notitia also mentions the Baths of Anastasia (Thermas Anastasianas) and the Domum nobilissimae Arcadiae, 'House of the nobilissima Arcadia'.

=== Regio X ===
The X^{th} regio was the site of the Nympheum Maius, a nymphaeum connected with the end of the Aqueduct of Valens. The Baths of Constantine (Thermas Constantianas) in the X^{th} regio were here, on the right-hand side of the Mese odos's northward branch. These may have been the baths referred to by Eusebius as having been built by Constantine I near his tomb, but it is more likely that construction of these thermae was begun by his son Constantius II; they were not finished for many years afterwards. Three imperial residences were named by the Notitia: the Domum Augustae Placidiae, 'House of Placidia augusta', the Domum Augustae Eudociae, 'House of Eudocia augusta', and the Domum nobilissimae Arcadiae, 'House of the nobilissima Arcadia'. Furthermore, there was the "Church or Martyrium of Saint Acacius" (Ecclesia sive martyrium sancti Acacii). The X^{th} regio was a roughly square area in the city's northwest, beside the Golden Horn, separated from the IX^{th} regio by "a wide road that is like a river flowing between them" (platea magna velut fluvio dividitur); this likely referred to the Mese, although it is possible that the Notitita's text originally referred to the boundary with the VIII^{th} regio and has subsequently become corrupt.

=== Regio XI ===
The XI^{th} regio – to the southwest of the X^{th} regio and north of the XII^{th} – was among the largest regiones, and one of only two land-locked regiones (with the VIII^{th} regio). Most notably it was the regio of the Church of the Holy Apostles, originally built as the mausoleum of Constantine and named as the Martyrium Apostolorum, 'Martyrium of the Apostles' in the Notitia. This stood on the top of Constantinople's IV^{th} Hill, one of the highest points within the Constantinian Walls and over 60 m above sea level. (The site is now the Fatih Mosque, Istanbul.) From here, it extended all the way to the Mese odos's southern branch, where the Brazen bull (Bovem aereum) stood in the Notitia's day, a site later known as the Βοῦς, Boûs, 'Bull' or the Forum Bovis, 'Forum of the Bull', though it was not named as a forum by the Notitia. It does name two palaces in the XI^{th} regio: the residences of Aelia Flaccilla (Palatium Flaccillianum), first wife of Theodosius I, and of the augusta Pulcheria (Domum Augustae Pulcheriae), co-empress with her brother Theodosius II. The regio also contained two cisterns named by the Notitia: the Cistern of Modestus and the Cistern of Arcadius.

=== Regio XII ===
The southwestern corner of the walled city was occupied by the XII^{th} regio. It contained the Golden Gate, which marked the entrance to the city from nearby Rhegium along a route established by Constantine. From the Golden Gate the southern branch of the Mese odos ran to the Forum of Theodosius established by Theodosius I; the street was probably entirely flanked by colonnades (the porticus Troadenses, 'Troadesian porticoes') and the Chronicon Paschale even described the Constantinian Walls as 'Troadesian walls'. Between the Golden Gate and the Forum of Theodosius I there was the Forum of Arcadius, in which stood the Column of Arcadius, though because this Forum was completed in the reign of Arcadius's successor Theodosius II it too was known as a forum of Theodosius. On the coast of the XII^{th} regio was the Harbour of Theodosius, later named the Harbour of Eleutherios. Shielded by the security of the Golden Gate and the Walls, the Constantinopolitan mint established by Constantine I was located here.

=== Regio XIII ===
The XIII^{th} regio was outside the walled city of Constantinople. It stood on the opposite bank of the Golden Horn, at Sycae, later called Pera and Galata, and now Beyoğlu. Regular ferries connected it with the metropolis, and settlement was clustered around a single main street on the shoreline, above which rose the steep terrain. It had a theatre, probably dating from Sycae's time as an independent city outside Byzantium. There were, additionally, a Forum of Honorius and the Baths of Honorius (Thermas Honorianas). Besides these, the shipyard or docks (navalia) were sited in the XIII^{th} regio.

Sycae was renamed Justinianopolis (Medieval Greek: Ἰουστινιανούπολις, Latin: Iustinianopolis) after the emperor Justinian I, who also restored its ancient theatre. This suggests it maintained an existence quasi-independent from Constantinople proper.

=== Regio XIV ===
The location of the XIV^{th} regio is uncertain. The Notitia Urbis Constantinopolitanae was clear that the regio was outside the main circuit of the Walls, that it was contained within walls of its own at some remove from the peninsula, and that it appeared to be a city (civitatis) of its own. Within were a church, a palace and a sports-field (lusorium), a theatre, a nymphaeum, public baths (thermae), and "bridge on wooden piles" (pontem sublicium sive ligneum).

Cyril Mango and John Matthews concluded in papers in 2002 and 2012 that the city of Regium (Ancient Greek: Ῥήγιον, romanized: Rhḗgion), twelve Roman miles from Constantinople's main enceinte, was the XIV^{th} regio, with the wooden pile bridge spanning the coastal lagoon between Regium and the city centre. Matthews had earlier thought the XIV^{th} regio was at Balat, while Mango had previously argued for several other interpretations. Mango had proposed either Eyüp or Silahtarağa, since both places had a bridge in the past, though Silahtarağa's bridge was over the Barbyses River rather than the Golden Horn, and Mango discredited the older prevailing suggestion that the XIV^{th} regio referred to the area of Blachernae. Blachernae touched, and was later incorporated within, the city walls; this does not suit the Notitia's description of the regio as "separated from it [the city] by some distance lying between" (tamen quia spatio interiecto divisa est).

== Bibliography ==
=== Primary sources ===
Notitia Urbis Constantinopolitinae

- Matthews, John (2012). "The Notitia Urbis Constantinopolitanae". In Grig, Lucy; Kelly, Gavin (eds.). Two Romes: Rome and Constantinople in late Antiquity. Oxford University Press. pp. 81–115. ISBN 978-0-19-973940-0. OCLC 796196995. (English translation.)
- "Notitia Urbis Constantinopolitanae - Livius". www.livius.org. (Latin text.)
- Seeck, Otto, ed. (1876). "Notitia Urbis Constantinopolitanae". Notitia dignitatum accedunt Notitia urbis Constantinopolitanae et laterculi prouinciarum. Berlin: Weidmann. pp. 229–242. OL 6965622M. (Latin text.)

Chronicon Paschale

- Whitby, Michael; Whitby, Mary (1989). Chronicon Paschale 284-628 AD. Translated Texts for Historians 7. Liverpool University Press. doi:10.3828/978-0-85323-096-0. ISBN 978-0-85323-096-0. (English translation.)
- Dindorf, Ludwig, ed. (1832). Chronicon Paschale ad exemplar Vaticanum. Corpus scriptorum historiae Byzantinae XI. Bonn: E. Weber. (Greek text, Latin translation.)

=== Secondary sources ===
Mango, Marlia Mundell (2000). "The Commercial Map of Constantinople". Dumbarton Oaks Papers. 54: 189–207. doi:10.2307/1291839. JSTOR 1291839.

Matthews, John (2012). "The Notitia Urbis Constantinopolitanae". In Grig, Lucy; Kelly, Gavin (eds.). Two Romes: Rome and Constantinople in late Antiquity. Oxford University Press. pp. 81–115. ISBN 978-0-19-973940-0. OCLC 796196995.

Jones, A. H. M.; Martindale, J. R.; Morris, J. (1971). The Prosopography of the Later Roman Empire. Volume 1, A.D. 260-395. Cambridge University Press. ISBN 978-1-107-11920-8. OCLC 59164561.
