= Capitolium of Constantinople =

Temple of Constantinople

The Capitolium of Constantinople (Latin: Capitolium Constantinopolis; Ancient Greek: Καπιτώλιον) was a public edifice erected in Constantinople (today's Istanbul) by Emperor Constantine the Great. Founded as a capitolium (a temple dedicated to the Capitoline Triad), in the fifth century it was turned into an institute of higher education.

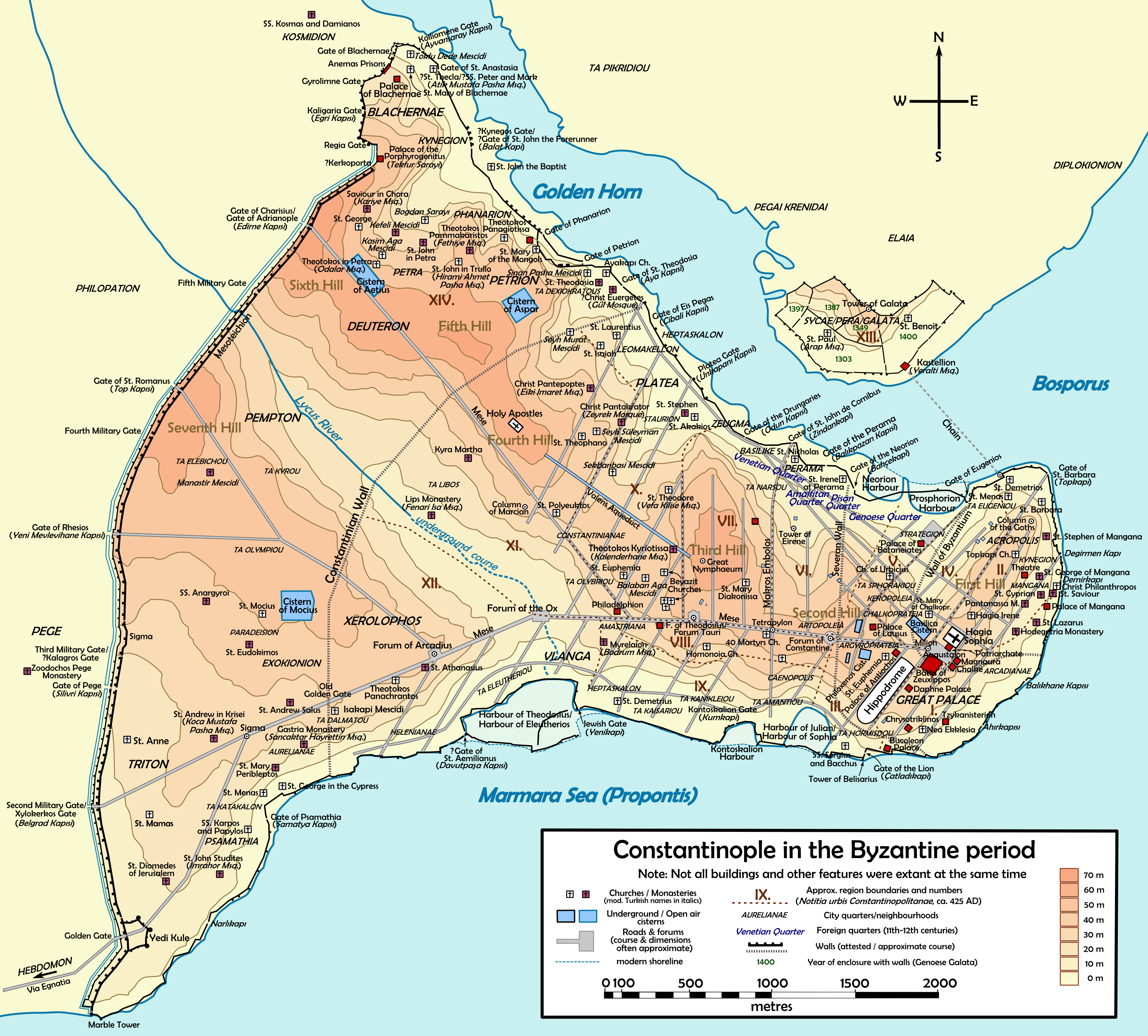
Map of Byzantine Constantinople. The Capitolium lay on the southern slopes of the third hill, northwest of the Forum of Theodosius.

== Location ==
Originally the Capitolium was thought to be located at the top of the third hill of Constantinople, which is now occupied by the University of Istanbul. However, this position is refuted by De Ceremoniis, a 10th-century Byzantine ceremonial handbook, which mentions it as a landmark along the Emperor's triumphal procession. The procession started at the Golden Gate, and moved along the southern branch of the Mese thoroughfare, reaching in succession the Forum of the Ox (placed at today's Aksaray), the Capitolium and the Philadelphion (placed at today's Şehzadebaşı semt). The temple's position should then be between the Forum of the Ox and the Philadelphion, northwest of the Forum of Theodosius. To reach it, one had to climb the southern slopes of the third hill, akin to the ascent to Rome's Capitoline Hill to go to the Jupiter's Temple. Administratively it belonged to the eighth regio of the city.

== History ==
The Capitolium was erected in Constantinople by Emperor Constantine the Great (r. 306–337). The building, together with the circus, the Great Palace, the Strategion and the Forum of Constantine, was one of those edifices needed to introduce the city as the new Rome. The edifice was originally a capitolium, that is a pagan temple dedicated to the Capitoline Triad, but in the early fifth century a cross had already been put on its roof, although a conversion to church is not attested. Near the temple were built houses for the rich. At the latest in 425 AD the Capitolium was turned into an academy of higher education, the Pandidakterion, hosting public lessons at the southern exedrae. The sole purpose of the school was to educate civil servants for the administration of the state. There is no evidence that the Pandidakterion continued to work after the end of the reign of Heraclius (r. 610–641) .

== Description ==
According to a law promulgated on 27 February 425 AD by Emperor Theodosius II (r. 402–450) and contained in the Codex Theodosianus, it is known that the Capitolium was a rectangular edifice whose southern side had "large and magnificent" exedrae which bordered the porticoed side of a public road. This road could possibly be the Mese, and the building overlooked the road near the junction whence one of its branches led to the Golden Gate. The Capitolium had also exedrae along its eastern and western sides, but these did not border any road, and until 425 were occupied by popinae ("wine bars" in the Roman world). The edifice was gilded, and its roof was covered with gilded bronze tiles, like the Temple of Jupiter Capitolinus in Rome, and topped by a cross (which fell during a storm in 407 AD).

== Bibliography ==
=== Primary sources ===
- IMPERATORIS THEODOSII CODEX (in Latin). Constantinopolis.

=== Secondary sources ===
- Janin, Raymond (1950). Constantinople Byzantine (in French) (1 ed.). Paris: Institut français d'etudes byzantines.
- Josephine Crawley Quinn; Andrew Wilson (29 July 2013). "Capitolia*". The Journal of Roman Studies. Vol. 103. Cambridge: Cambridge University Press. pp. 117–173. doi:10.1017/S0075435813000105.
- Athanasios Markopoulos (2019). "Education in Constantinople during the byzantine period". History of Istanbul. Vol. 8.
