= Strategion =

Public square in Constantinople

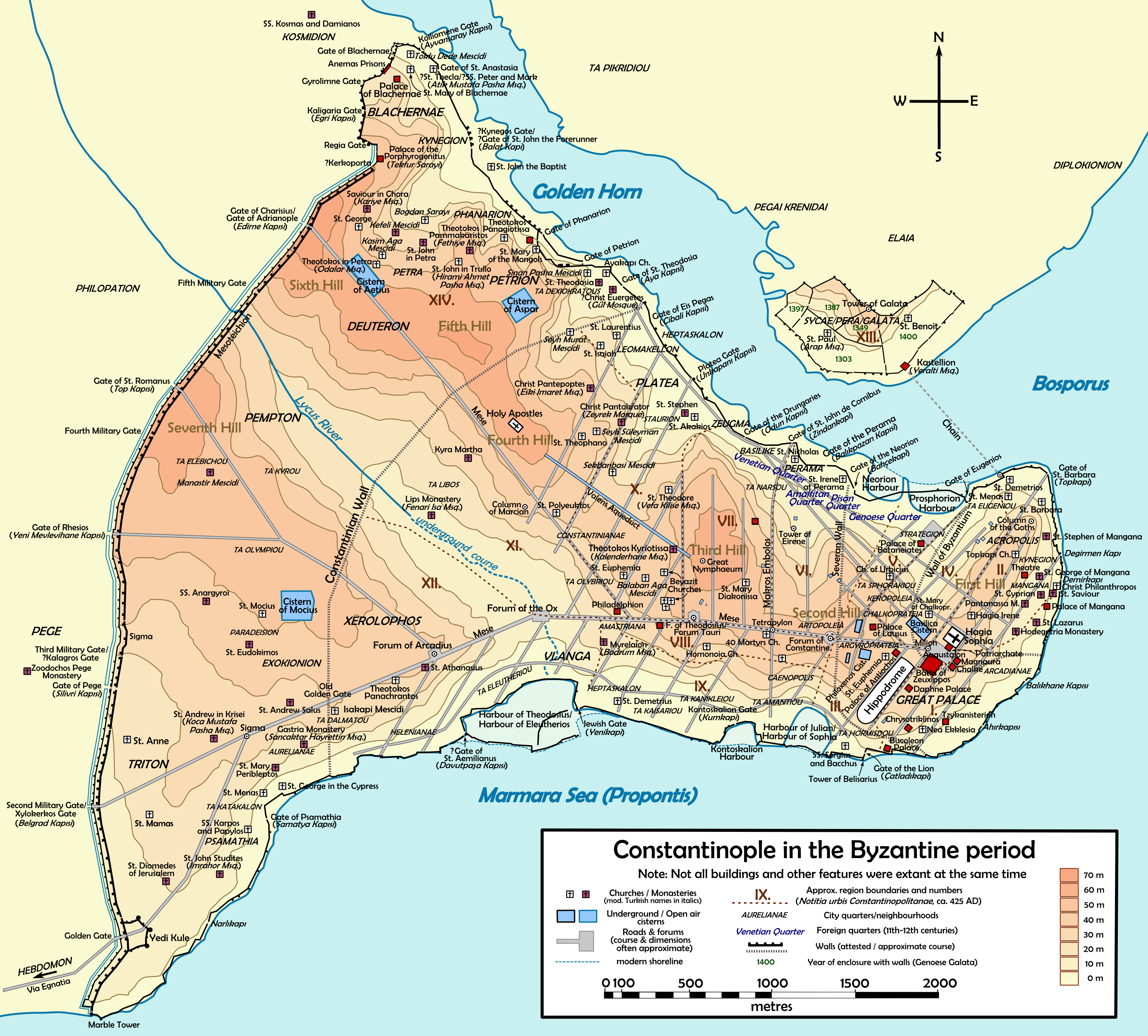
Map of Byzantine Constantinople. The Strategion was located at the northern end of the fifth region, near the Golden Horn, to the southwest of today's Sirkeci.

The Strategion (Greek: τὸ Στρατήγιον) was a public square and market located in Constantinople. The square was the equivalent of Campus Martius for Rome, while the market was one of the most important of the city.

== Origin of the name ==
The name possibly comes from the military exercises which took place there, akin to those in Rome's Campus Martius, or from the victorious generals (Greek: στρατηγός, pl. στρατηγοί, pr. strategos) who received military honors in this place.

== Location ==
The square was located in the fifth region of Constantinople, in the valley separating the first hill from the second. Based on an account by Pierre Gilles, a French traveler of the 16th century, who claimed to have seen a granite Theban obelisk near the glassmakers' house that stood at the north end of the Topkapı Palace, the Strategion was thought to be located on the north side of sultan's palace. More recent research, based on the surveying of the region by Ernest Mamboury, has set its location at the bottom of the north slope of the first hill of the city, near the Neorion and Prosphorion Harbours along the Golden Horn.

== History ==
The Strategion possibly predated the foundation of Constantinople in 330 AD, and had an Hellenistic origin. According to one tradition, the square was created by Alexander the Great (r. 336 BC – 323 BC), and was restored by Septimius Severus (r. 193–211) after the destruction of Byzantium. The square was possibly included inside the walled city of Byzantion, and was the first agora of the city. People coming from the sea met the Strategion as soon as they entered the city walls, after crossing the gate of Eugenius (Turkish: Yalıköşkü kapısı). The Strategion could also be accessed from land, after crossing the gate of Urbicius.

Originally conceived as a military parade ground, it was turned into a public square by Constantine (r. 306–337), and renewed by Theodosius I (r. 379–395), who possibly transformed its representative part into a forum and gained a market in a smaller section. Over time, the importance of the Strategion as a representative center diminished, and in the eleventh century the square had become only a large marketplace.

== Description ==
About its layout not much is known, but it was possibly rectangular, like those of other Hellenistic foundations, like Miletus, Priene and Palmyra. The Strategion was divided in two zones, with different functions: a larger one ("mega strategion"), devoted to representative duties, and a smaller one ("mikron strategion"), commercial. The structure was adjacent to two small harbors lying along the south shore of the Golden Horn: the Neorion, which connected the city with the suburb of Sykae, on the northern shore of the gulf, and the Prosphorion, which was the terminal of the sea traffic with Chalcedon, on the Asian shore.

Its original military function is confirmed by several military monuments in its premises: a statue of Constantine the Great, another of Emperor Leo I (r. 457–474) erected in the mikron strategion, a bronze tripod and a statue of the Fortuna goddess bearing a cornucopia over an arch. Near the statue of Constantine lay a stone obelisk bearing an inscription where the Emperor proclaims the city as the new Rome. According to a tradition, a statue of Alexander the Great, originally erected by his soldiers in Chrysopolis to thank him for having received double salary, stood on the square after being moved there by Constantine.

A sculpture group called pelargos (Greek: Πελαργός, "stork" in Greek), representing three storks facing each other, and carved by Apollonius of Tyana, was erected at the Strategion. The group was displayed there to ward off the storks, because the birds used to drop the remains of caught snakes in the nearby water cisterns, polluting the water.

The forum had also a representational function: when the emperor landed at one of the two harbors, and wanted to climb the hill to go to the Hagia Sophia and the great Palace, entering the city through one of the two gates cited above, the senators with the Eparch greeted him at the Strategion, offering him crowns. The forum was also the arrival point of imperial processions: in fact the Emperor, standing on top of a chariot and accompanied by a mounted escort, descended regularly from its palace to the Strategion to inspect the grain depots. During one of these processions, Emperor Theodosius II (r. 402–450) was attacked with stones by a hungry mob because of lack of bread.

The most important function of the Strategion was the commercial one: along the square lay four warehouses: the horrea olearia and the horrea troadensia, valentiaca and costantiaca, respectively oil (the first) and wheat (the latter three) depots, whose content fed the population of the city. In the square converged several arcaded roads (Greek: Ἔμβολος, pl. Ἔμβολοι pr. embolos) devoted to commerce. Moreover, the square hosted two markets (Latin: macellum, pl. macella), devoted to meat and fish: butchers came there to buy livestock branded for sale by the Praefectus urbi, and until the beginning of Lent merchants of sheep were allowed to sell there their animals, while from Easter until Ascension lambs were sold at the Forum Tauri.

Along or near the Strategion lay the churches of the Theotokos, built by the strategos Urbicius, Aghios Epiphanios, Aghios Philemon, which contained chapels dedicated to Aghios Anastasion of Persia and Aghios Sabas, a martyrion dedicated to Aghios Photios and Aniketos, and Aghios Andreas. Also one of the most important baths of the city, the Baths of Achilles, lay in its immediate vicinity. Near the Strategion lay also the city's first prison, predating Constantine's reign and abandoned because of its filthy conditions by Phocas (r. 602–610) .

== Sources ==
- Janin, Raymond (1950). Constantinople Byzantine (in French). Paris: Institut Français d'Etudes Byzantines.
- Mamboury, Ernest (1953). The Tourists' Istanbul. Istanbul: Çituri Biraderler Basımevi.
- Mango, Marlia Mundell (2000). "The Commercial Map of Constantinople". Dumbarton Oaks Papers. 54: 189–207. doi:10.2307/1291839. JSTOR 1291839.
- Nigel Westbrook (2013). "Notes towards the reconstruction of the Forum of the Strategion and its Related Roads in Early Byzantine Constantinople". Journal of the Australian Early Medieval Association. 9 (January 2013). University of Western Australia: 9–46. doi:10.35253/JAEMA.2013.1.1.
