= Exakionion =

Exakionion (Greek: Ἑξακιώνιον) or Exokionion (Ἑξωκιόνιον) was an area in Byzantine Constantinople. Its exact location and extent vary considerably in the sources.

== Name ==
The name is given in various forms (Ἑξακιώνιον, Ἑξακιόνι[ο]ν, Ἑξωκιόνιον, Ἑξωκιώνιν, Ἑξωκιώνην), but according to Raymond Janin, it likely derives from a name like Ἑξωκιώνια, meaning "exterior colonnade" (i.e., outside the Wall of Constantine), deriving from a column placed by Constantine the Great in front of the wall, surmounted with a statue of himself.

== Location ==
The Byzantine authors apply the term to a variety of heights between the Golden Horn and the Marmara Sea, in the portion of the city between the original Wall of Constantine and the later Theodosian Walls. More broadly, the term was apparently applied to almost the entire area between the walls, but also designated a more specific quarter therein.

Based on the descriptions of imperial ceremonies in the 10th-century De Ceremoniis, that quarter was to the northeast of the area called Sigma, and close to the hill of Xerolophos. According to the Patria of Constantinople, the Exakionion was situated on a hill, being the highest point of the old Constantinian wall, which fell towards the sea on both sides. The sources make clear that a gate existed at Exakionion that pierced the Wall of Constantine, through which the road from the Golden Gate of the Theodosian Walls passed into the older city, and thence led, flanked by a double portico, through the various forums of the city, to the Chalke Gate of the Great Palace of Constantinople.

This gate at Exakionion is therefore commonly held to have been the main gate of Constantine's city wall, or "Old Golden Gate", mentioned in the Notitia Urbis Constantinopolitanae. This gate is in turn usually identified with the structure labelled porta antiquissima pulchra in the 15th-century map of Cristoforo Buondelmonti. After the Fall of Constantinople it became known as Isakapı ("Gate of Jesus") in Turkish, and survived until destroyed by an earthquake in 1508/09. The descriptions of the Patria and the 14th-century author Pseudo-Kodinos also give grounds to identify this "Old Golden Gate" with the "Old Gate of the Prodromos" (ἡ παλαιὰ πόρτα τοῦ Προδρόμου) from a nearby monastery of St. John Prodromos, built by Constantine the Great against the city wall, but this gate may have been situated a bit further north.

== Monuments ==
Apart from the statue of Constantine the Great, there were a number of other monuments in the quarter. Emperor Maurice (r. 582–602) erected a number of other statues around that of Constantine; Pseudo-Kodinos reports that columns brought from Cyzicus still stood in the area. There were also a public bath, a mansion of the 12th-century aristocrat Andronikos Doukas Angelos, and three churches, dedicated to the Theotokos, the Holy Trinity, and Saint Eudokimos.

== Sources ==
- Guilland, Rodolphe (1969). Études de topographie de Constantinople byzantine, Tome II (in French). Berlin: Akademie-Verlag.
- Janin, Raymond (1950). Constantinople byzantine. Développement urbaine et répertoire topographique. Paris: Institut Français d'Études Byzantines.
