= Sarayburnu =

Promontory in Istanbul, Turkey

Coordinates: 41.0169°N 28.9864°E

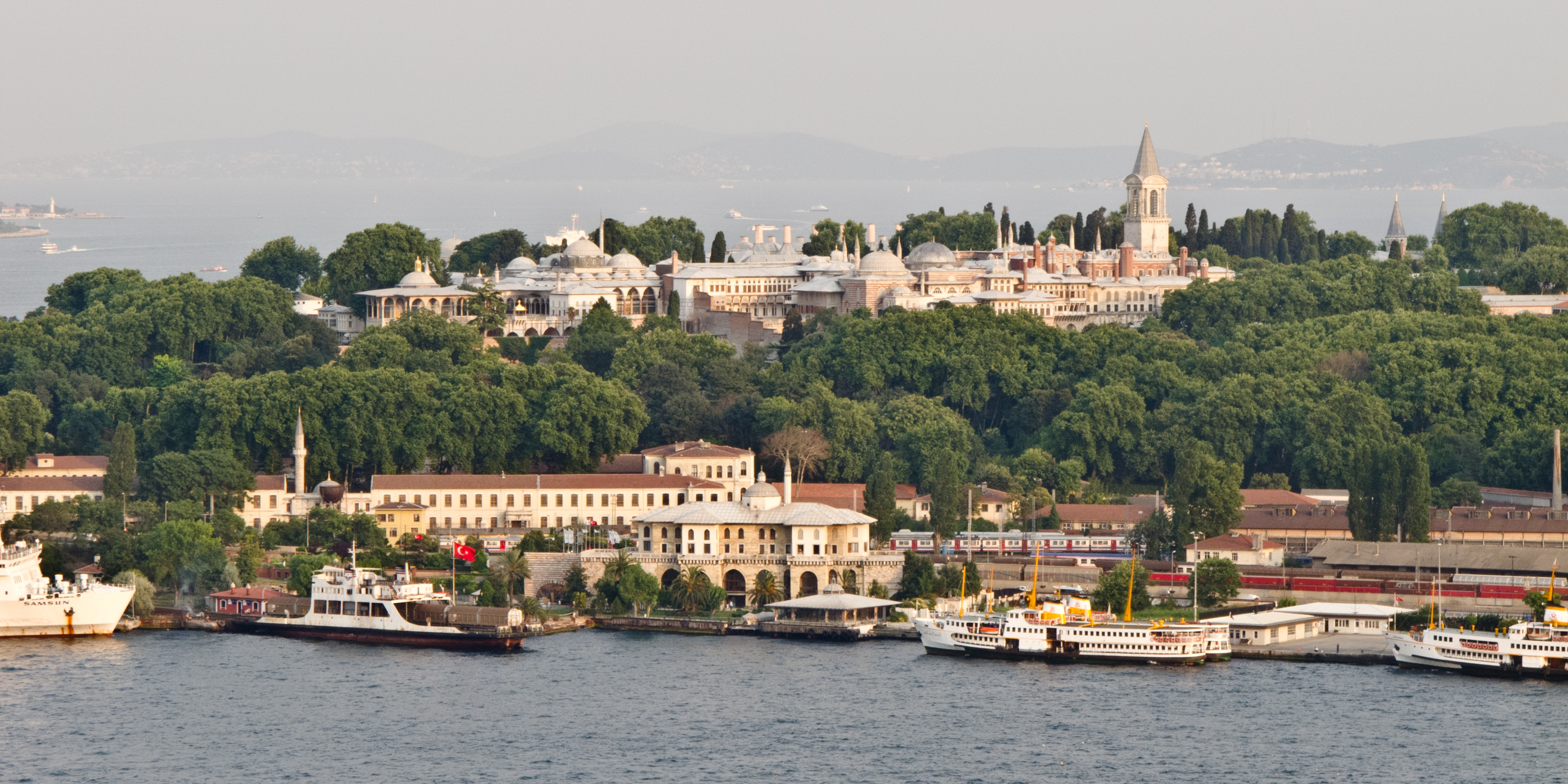
Topkapı Palace at the Seraglio Point

Sarayburnu (Turkish: Sarayburnu, meaning Palace Cape; known in English as the Seraglio Point) is a promontory quarter separating the Golden Horn and the Sea of Marmara in Istanbul, Turkey. The area is where the Topkapı Palace and Gülhane Park stand. Sarayburnu is included in the historic areas of Istanbul, added to the UNESCO World Heritage List in 1985.

== History ==
The first settlement on the Sarayburnu goes back to Neolithic, c. 6600 BC. The settlement lasted for almost a millennium before being inundated by the rising level of the sea; however, it might have been moved further inland. The artifacts from this settlement recovered during excavations display some of the distinct features of other artifacts found in other excavations in northwestern Turkey.

Prior to the 7th century BC, there may have been a small Thracian settlement at the promontory. Some scholars have linked it to the possibly Thracian toponym of "Lygos", which is attested in Pliny the Elder as having been an earlier name of the site of Byzantium. Only a few walls and substructures belonging to this settlement have survived to date, near the location where the famous Topkapı Palace now stands. During the period of ancient Byzantium, the Acropolis used to stand where the Topkapı Palace stands today.

According to a legend, in 667 BC ancient Greek settlers from Megara (near Athens) under the command of King Byzas established Byzantium at the Sarayburnu. Previously, in 685 BC, the Megarans had established Chalcedon (present-day Kadıköy) on the Anatolian shore, across the Bosporus. Actually the oldest settlements in present-day Istanbul are found on the Anatolian side; such as the Fikirtepe mound which dates from the Chalcolithic period (Copper Age), with artifacts dating from 5500 to 3500 BC. In nearby Kadıköy (ancient Chalcedon), a large port settlement dating from the Phoenicians (which predates the Megaran settlement) has been discovered.

In antiquity there were two natural harbours in the area close to Sarayburnu where the present-day Sirkeci and Eminönü quarters stand (the harbours of Prosphorion and Neorion, which scooped into the coastline of the Golden Horn.) Because of this formation, the point of Sarayburnu was more conspicuous than it is today. In later periods the area was the convergence point for the Sea Walls of the Golden Horn and the Sea of Marmara. In the Byzantine period, the area was known in Greek as Hagios Demetrios.

During the railway construction of the late Ottoman period, in 1871, the city walls of the Sarayburnu area were partially demolished, but they are still intact in some areas - especially close to the Topkapı Palace, which was built in the 15th century for the Ottoman Sultans. The notable Gülhane Park is located right next to the palace.

== See also ==
- Geography of Istanbul
- Seraglio
