= Prosphorion Harbour =

Historic port of Constantinople

Coordinates: 41.016°N 28.980°E

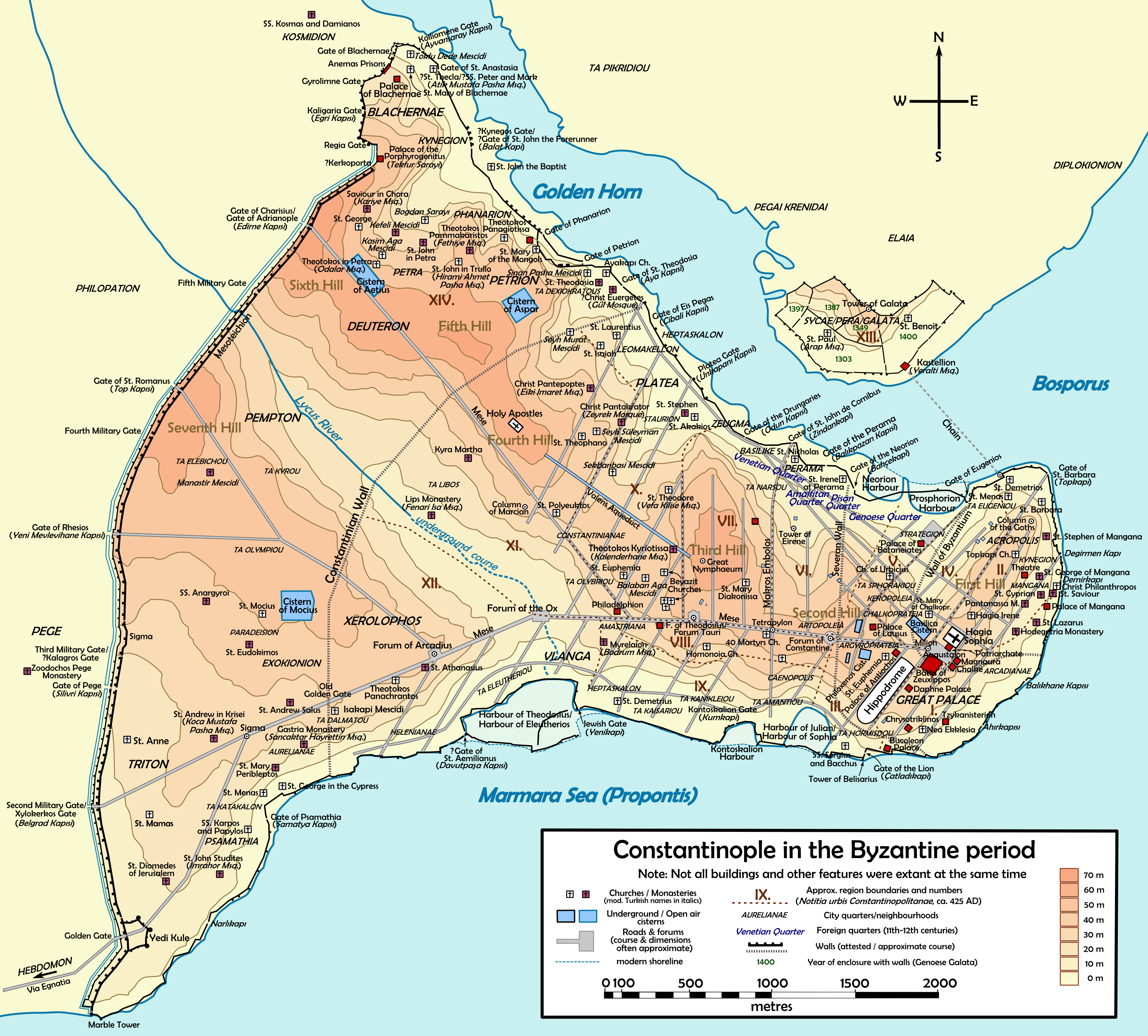
Map of Byzantine Constantinople. The Prosphorion harbour is located in the eastern part of the city, on the southern shore of the Golden Horn, near its mouth into the Bosphorus

The Prosphorion Harbour (Greek: Προσφόριον) was a harbour in the city of Constantinople, active from the time when the city was still the Greek colony of Byzantium (657 BC – 324 AD), until the eve of the first millennium. Gradually enlarged, it was the first port to be built in the area of the future Constantinople.

== Location ==
The harbour lay on the southern shore of the Golden Horn, east of today's Galata Bridge, in the fifth region of Constantinople, where the sea walls made a deep nick, in correspondence of the Byzantine Gate of Eugenius (the Ottoman Yalıköşkü kapısı), and extended successively westwards, finally occupying the first inlet after the estuary entrance. The inlet where the basin once lay is now silted up, and corresponds today to the east part of the Sirkeci railway station area, south of the Ottoman Sepetçiler köşkü. Administratively, the site belongs to the Mahalle of Hoca Paşa in Eminönü, which is part of the Fatih district (the walled city) of Istanbul.

== History and description ==
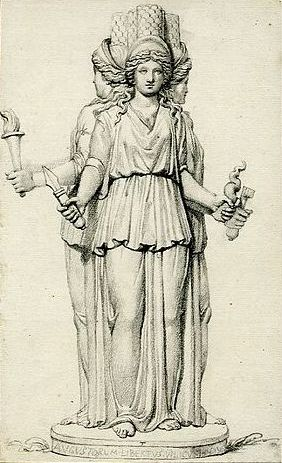
The goddess Hecate: the harbour's name could derive from one of her appellatives, "Phosphoros" ("Light-bringer")

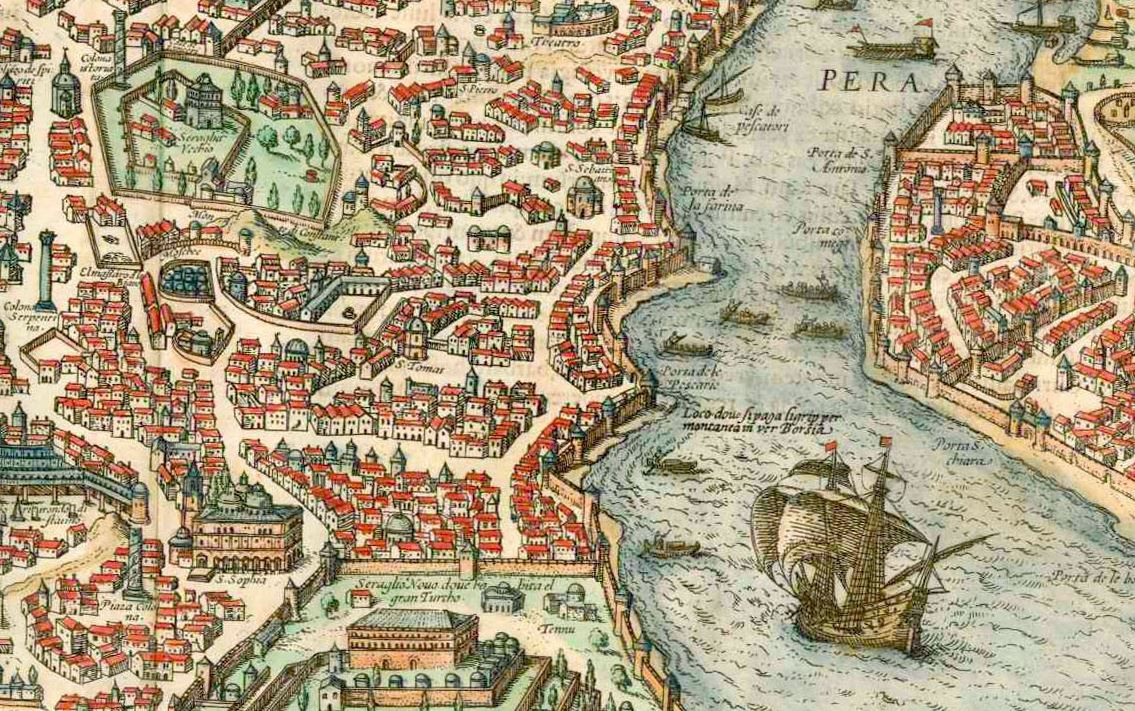
The Prosphorion harbour (first inlet from bottom along the left side of Golden Horn), from Byzantium nunc Constantinopolis by Braun and Hogenberg, 1572

The first harbour to be built in Constantinople's area during the time when it was the city-state of Byzantium lay on the Golden Horn, at the entrance of the Bosporus, in the angle formed by the sea and the end of Byzantium's walls, corresponding with the future Byzantine quarter named "ta Eugeniou" (Greek: τὰ Εὑγενίου) after the Gate of Eugenius of the sea wall (the Ottoman Yaliköşkü kapısı). Its position lay immediately under the northwest slope of the first hill of the city. Thanks to its location along the southern shore of the Golden Horn, the harbour was protected from the heavy storms provoked by the Lodos, the south-west wind blowing from the Marmara Sea. After the reconstruction of Byzantium following its destruction under Septimius Severus (r. 193–211), the harbour grew to the west, finally enclosing the whole area today occupied by the Sirkeci railway station and its dependencies. The first landing place to be met at the east, possibly lying near the Gate of Eugenius, was named after Timasius (d. 396), a high officer active under Emperors Valens (r. 364–378) and Theodosius I (r. 379–395). Right after the foundation of Constantinople by Constantine the Great in 324, the port received the name of "closed harbour" (Greek: κλειστός λιμήν, kleistos limen) since it was protected by moles and defended by the sea walls and by the Tower of Eugenius.

The name of "Prosphorion", which the harbour assumed after the foundation of Constantinople, could derive either from its proximity to the city market (Greek: πρόσφορον), or from another denomination of the place, Phosphorion (Greek: Φωσφόριον), because of a legend which saw Hecate Phosphoros ("Light-Bringer") helping there during the night the defenders of Byzantium besieged by Philip of Macedonia. Another theory assumes that the name came from the nearby market of the oxen (Greek: βοσπόριον, βοόσπορος, βόσπορος), which lay nearby, until it was moved by Emperor Constantine V (r. 741–75) to near the Forum Tauri.

About two hundred years before that, Justinian I (r. 527–65) had already moved the market of the sea goods from the Prosphorion to the larger Portus Sophiae on the Marmara Sea. Inside the harbour, a landing place, the Scala Chalcedonensis, had been reserved for the inhabitants of Chalcedon, on the opposite side of the Bosporus. Despite that, the port had a purely commercial function: at the Prosphorion landed the commodities imported from the Bosporus, the Black Sea and Asia. As a result, the area was surrounded by many storehouses: the Notitia Urbis Constantinopolitanae records that during the 5th century four out of six horrea present in the city lay in the Prosphorion area. However, the harbour was subjected to heavy silting, so that at the eve of the first millennium it was definitively blocked by the mud. Its only surviving function until the late Palaiologan period was that of dockyard (Greek: ναύσταθμος, naustathmos) for the Emperor during his trips from the Palace of Blachernae to the Hagia Sophia cathedral. The dockyard lay just in front of the Gate of Eugenius, known in that period as the "Royal Gate" (Greek: πυλή βασιλική, pyle basilike), since the Emperor had to cross it in order to reach the church.

In 1457, shortly after the fall of the city in 1453 to the Ottoman Empire, the neglected harbour was included in the area protected by the walls of the newly built Sultan's palace.

== Sources ==
- Janin, Raymond (1964). Constantinople Byzantine (in French) (2 ed.). Paris: Institut Français d'Etudes Byzantines.
- Müller-Wiener, Wolfgang (1977). Bildlexikon zur Topographie Istanbuls: Byzantion, Konstantinupolis, Istanbul bis zum Beginn d. 17 Jh (in German). Tübingen: Wasmuth. ISBN 978-3-8030-1022-3.
