= Kontoskalion =

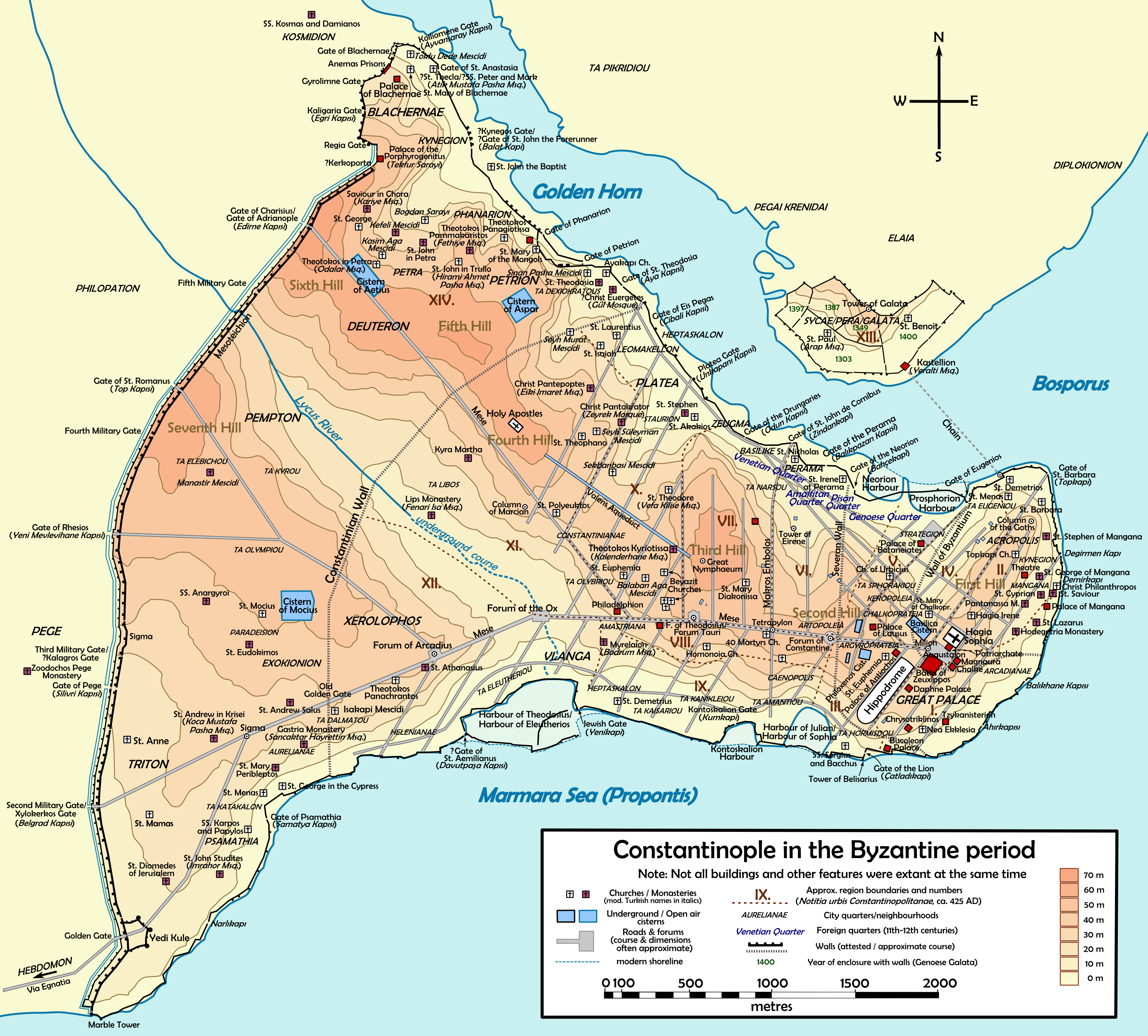
Map of Byzantine Constantinople. The Kontoskalion is located in the southeastern part of the city, and named Harbour of Julian/Sophia.

The Kontoskalion (Greek: Κοντοσκάλιον), also known as Harbour of Julian (Latin: Portus Iulianus, Greek: Λιμὴν τοῦ Ἰουλιανοῦ), Portus Novus ("New Port"), or Harbour of Sophia (Greek: Λιμὴν τῆς Σοφίας or Λιμὴν τῶν Σοφιῶν ή Σοφιανῶν), and in Ottoman times as Kadırga Limanı ("Harbour of the Galleys") was a harbour in the city of Constantinople, active from the 6th century until the early Ottoman period. In the literature it has been known under several names, and the sources about it are often contradictory.

== Location ==
The harbour lay in an inlet – still recognizable today in the flat landscape profile – of the Marmara Sea, in the third region of the city, at the southwest end of the valley of the Hippodrome. The area of the harbour complex covers part of today's Mahalleler of Kadırga Limanı and Kumkapi in the Fatih district (the walled city) of Istanbul. The “Galley Harbour street” or Kadirga Limani Caddesi in Istanbul still delineates the north shore of the old harbour.

== History ==
=== Byzantine period ===
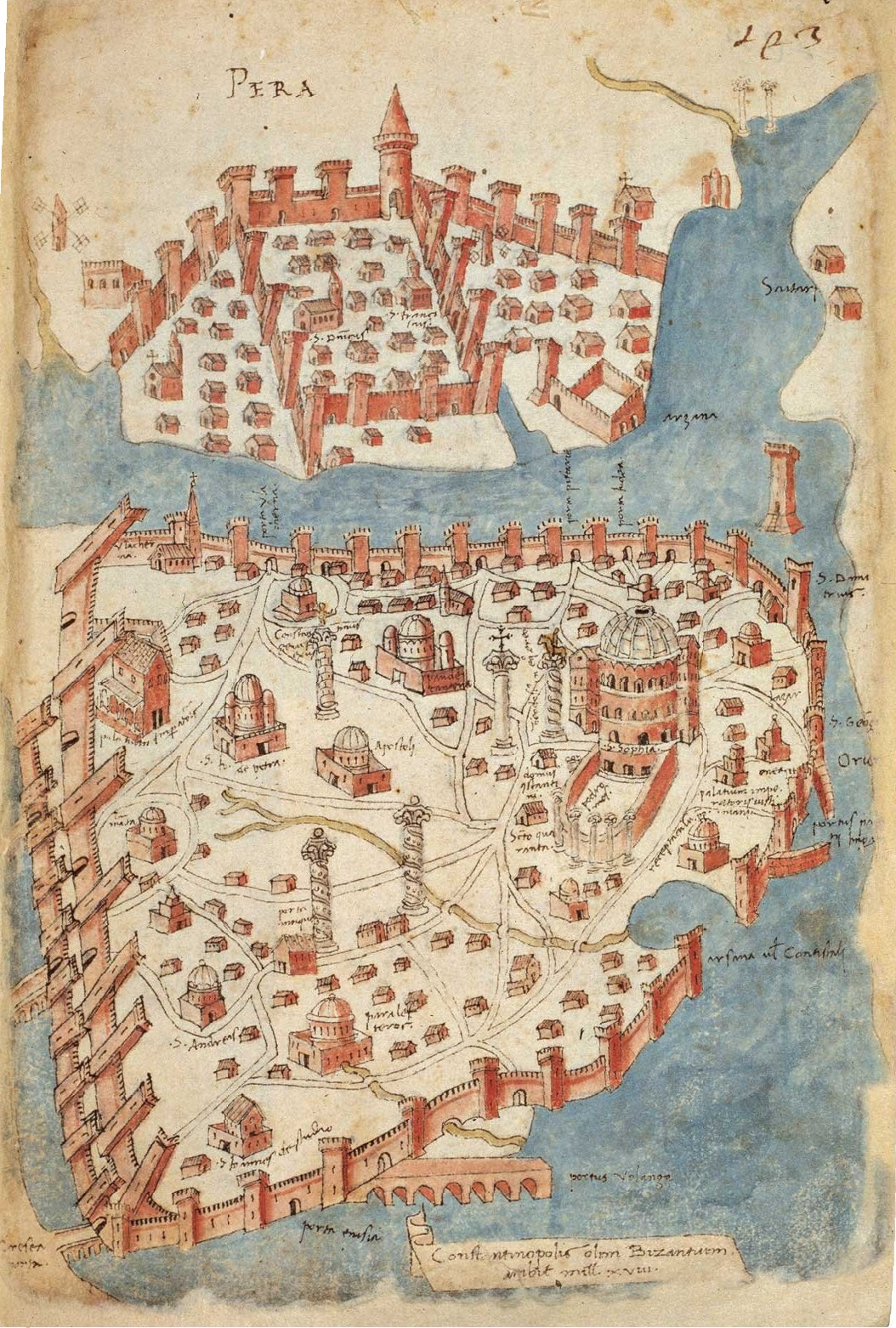
Map of Constantinople around 1420s-1430s, after Cristoforo Buondelmonti. The Kontoskalion is clearly visible on the central right part of the map, right of the Hippodrome: the semicircular convex mole protects it from the sea, while the sea walls separate it from the city.

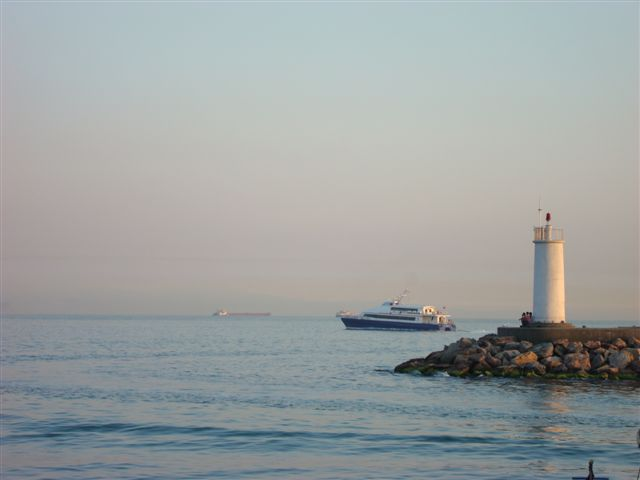
The Marmara Sea from Kumkapı. From here the Byzantine galleys approached the harbour, now silted up.

Already during the reign of Constantine the Great (r. 306–337) the site of the later harbour was used as a landing stage. In 362, during his short stay in the capital, Emperor Julian (r. 361-363) built on the Propontis shore a harbour named Portus Novus ("New Port") or Portus Iulianus (Greek: Λιμὴν τοῦ Ἰουλιανοῦ): at the same time he erected in front of it a crescent-shaped building named Sigma or Porticus Semirotunda. This decision was taken despite the many problems which affected the location: each port along the Marmara shore was undefended against the fierce storms caused by the intermittent southwest wind, the Lodos; these brought much sand into the basin, making necessary a periodic and expensive dredging; moreover, the heavy rains provoked erosion from the hills which caused silting too. On the other hand, the building of a harbour on the south shore was necessary to supply the western and southern regions of the city, too far from the Golden Horn.

The problems of this area were compounded by repeated urban fires, the first fire having occurred at the end of the 4th century partially destroying the area. In the 6th century, Emperor Anastasius I (r. 491-518) emptied the basin using hydraulic machines, built a mole and dredged the sandy substrate. Later, possibly under Justinian (r. 527–565), part of the traffic of the Neorion port, the first harbour built in the city, lying on the Golden Horn, was moved to the new harbour. After damage by another fire in 561, his successor Justin II (r. 565–578) in around 575 commissioned important works, dredging the ground again and enlarging the basin: the works were directed by two high officials, the praepositus Narses and the protovestiarios Troilos. In front of the enlarged harbour, renamed "Port of Sophia" (Greek: Λιμὴν τῆς Σοφίας) after Justin's empress, were erected four statues, representing Justin, Sophia, their daughter Arabia and Narses.

At the end of the century, the harbour also acquired a military function, which it did not lose until the end, becoming a base of the Byzantine navy. Emperor Philippikos Bardanes (r. 711–713) removed two of the statues adorning the Kontoskalion, since they bore prophetic inscriptions which he considered unfavorable. During his reign, Emperor Theophilos (r. 829–842) had an arsenal built near the harbour, in proximity of the Porta Leonis (the Ottoman Çatladı Kapı); it comprised a shipyard and armories. Between the 9th and the 11th century, the port remained operational: in that period, the writers of the Patria Constantinopolitanae began to refer to it also as Kontoskalion, which remains the modern Greek denomination of the quarter lying to its west, known in Turkish as Kumkapı.

After the end of the Latin Empire, the harbour appears in several sources under the name Kontoskelion, causing confusion among modern scholars. According to the Patria, this denomination is a patronymic referring to a certain Agallianos, a Byzantine tourmarches (senior army officer) nicknamed Kontoskeles because of his short legs, but the German scholar Albrecht Berger rejects this as a mistake by the Patria authors, due to the different etymology of the two words: "Kontoskalion" means "short step or wharf". Some authors, like Raymond Janin, have proposed that the name Kontoskelion (Greek: πρὸς τὸ Βλάγκα Κοντοσκέλιον) could refer to another harbour placed 150 m west of the Julian/Sophia harbour, nearer to the Vlanga area, but this interpretation should be disregarded, since it is certain that the Kontoskalion was the only port in use on the Marmara Sea until the 15th century. In that period, the harbour maintained its important function: during the Palaiologos dynasty, Emperor Michael VIII (r. 1259–1282) protected it with an ashlar wall and a chain, while his successor Andronikos II (r. 1282–1328) made the harbour deeper and closed its entrance with iron gates, protecting the ships from the storms that come with the Lodos. The harbour was attested in an encomium of Emperor John VIII (r. 1425–1448) written in 1427. From it we know that John VIII ordered repairs to the harbour, employing paid workers (among them were also clergymen and monks), and not servants. At the end of these works, the basin could host 300 galleys. In some versions of the map of Florentine traveller Cristoforo Buondelmonti (who visited Constantinople in 1421), the basin is shown flanked by its arsenal, and in the account of the Spanish traveller Pedro Tafur, who saw it in 1437, the harbour was still active. It remained so until the Fall of Constantinople in 1453.

=== Ottoman period ===
After the conquest of the city, in 1462 Sultan Mehmet II (r. 1444–1446; 1451–1481) fortified the harbour, now known as Kadırga Limanı ("Harbour of the Galleys"), building several towers. However, the beginning of the construction in 1515 of a new arsenal on the Golden Horn, the Tersâne-i Âmire, protected from the storms provoked by the southwest wind, and the enormous growth of the Ottoman navy, caused the decay of the Kadırga Limanı. The 16th-century French traveller Pierre Gilles reports that around 1540 the women living in that neighbourhood used to wash their clothes in the basin. However, in some 18th-century maps, the harbour is still shown in active use. The end of the port was accelerated by the erection of the Nuruosmaniye Mosque, started in 1748, since the excavated earth was partly thrown in the harbour. The basin and the arsenal have since long time disappeared, and today they are partly built up.

== Description ==
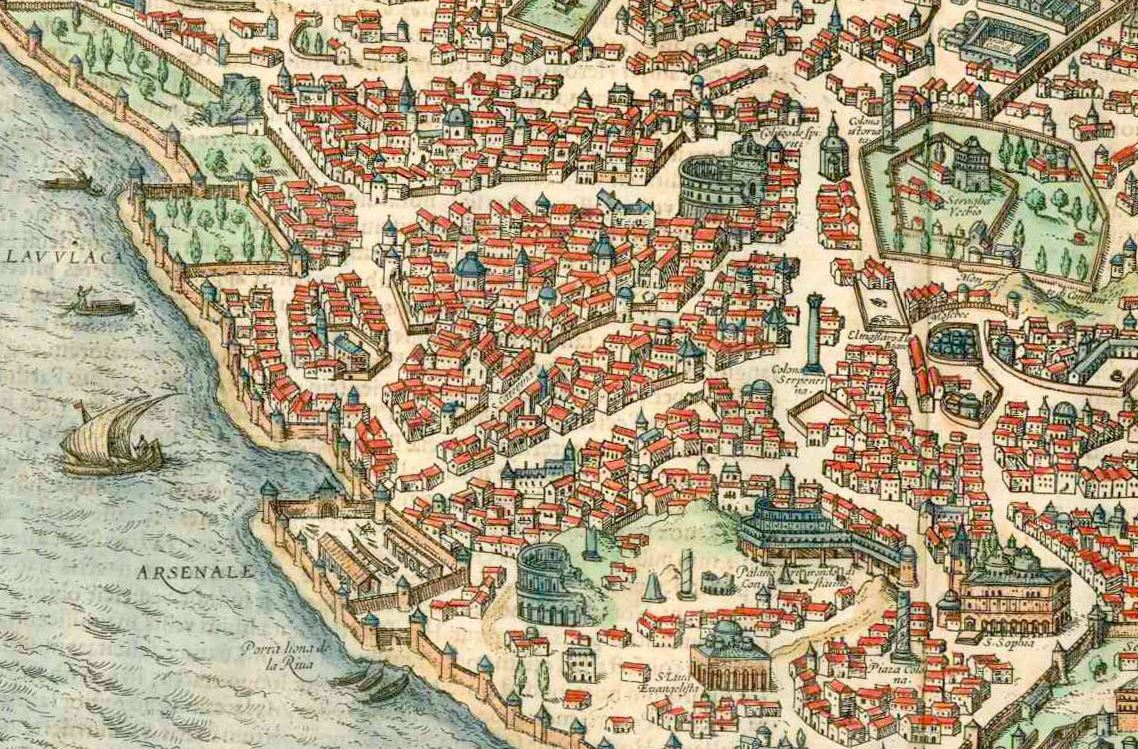
The Kadırga Limanı and its arsenal, from Byzantium nunc Constantinopolis by Braun and Hogenberg, 1572.

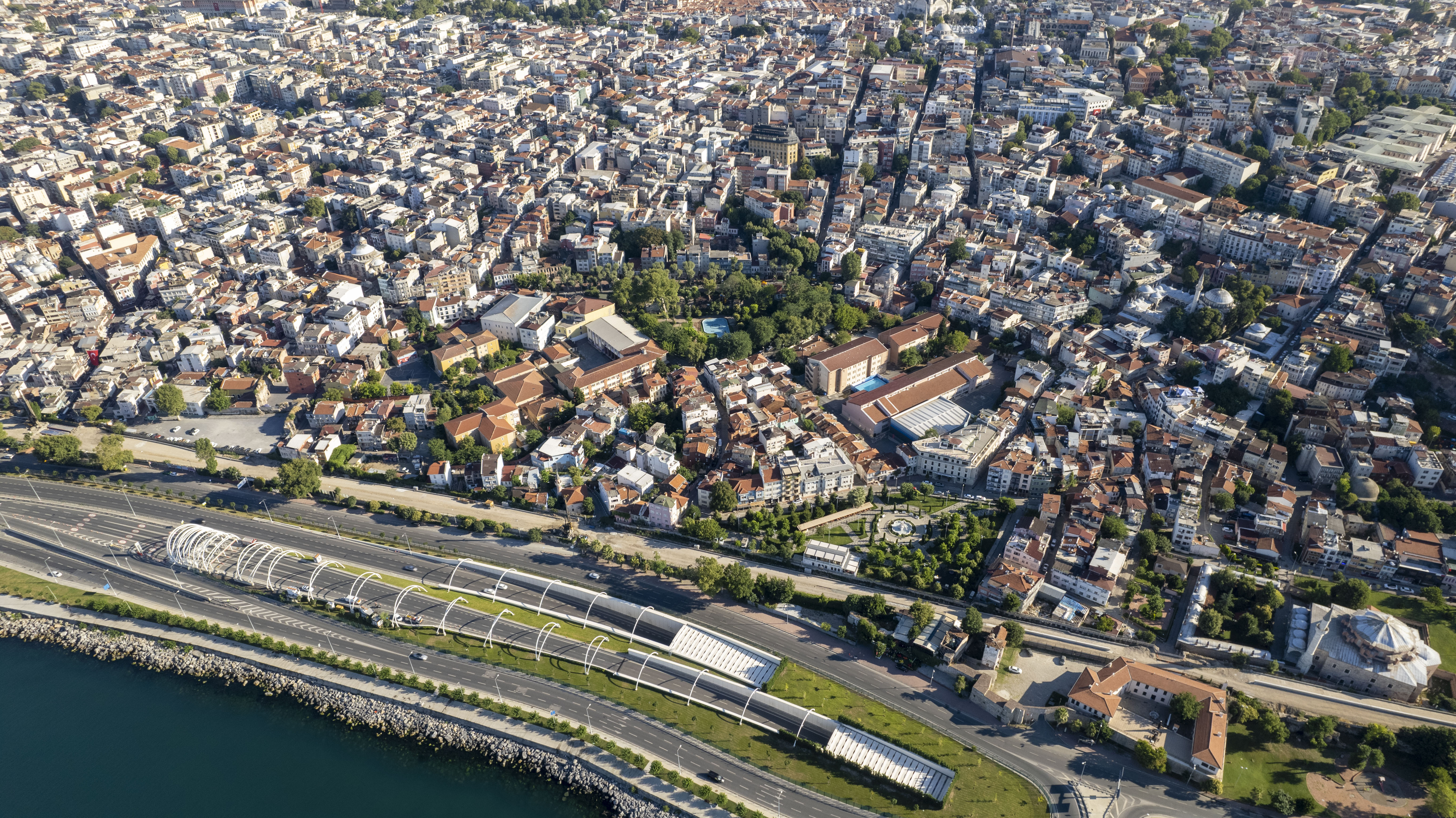
The current site of the Kontoskalion. it is occupied by parks and houses

In the first description of the area, stemming from the 6th century, the harbour is described as a basin flanked by an arsenal surrounded by walls. The first maps of the city show the same situation, with the arsenal extending in the plain area west of the Sokollu Mehmet Pasha Mosque until the old sea wall of Kumkapı, while the basin, protected by a mole, is delimited by the Sea Walls, still in place in 19th century.

According to Wolfgang Müller-Wiener, it is also possible that the arsenal area was originally another sea basin, but the division between Kontoskalion and Port of Sophia appearing on several old maps, where they are represented as separated harbors, should be refused, due to the topography of the area.
