= Forum of Arcadius =

Structure in Istanbul

Coordinates: 41°00′28″N 28°56′35″E

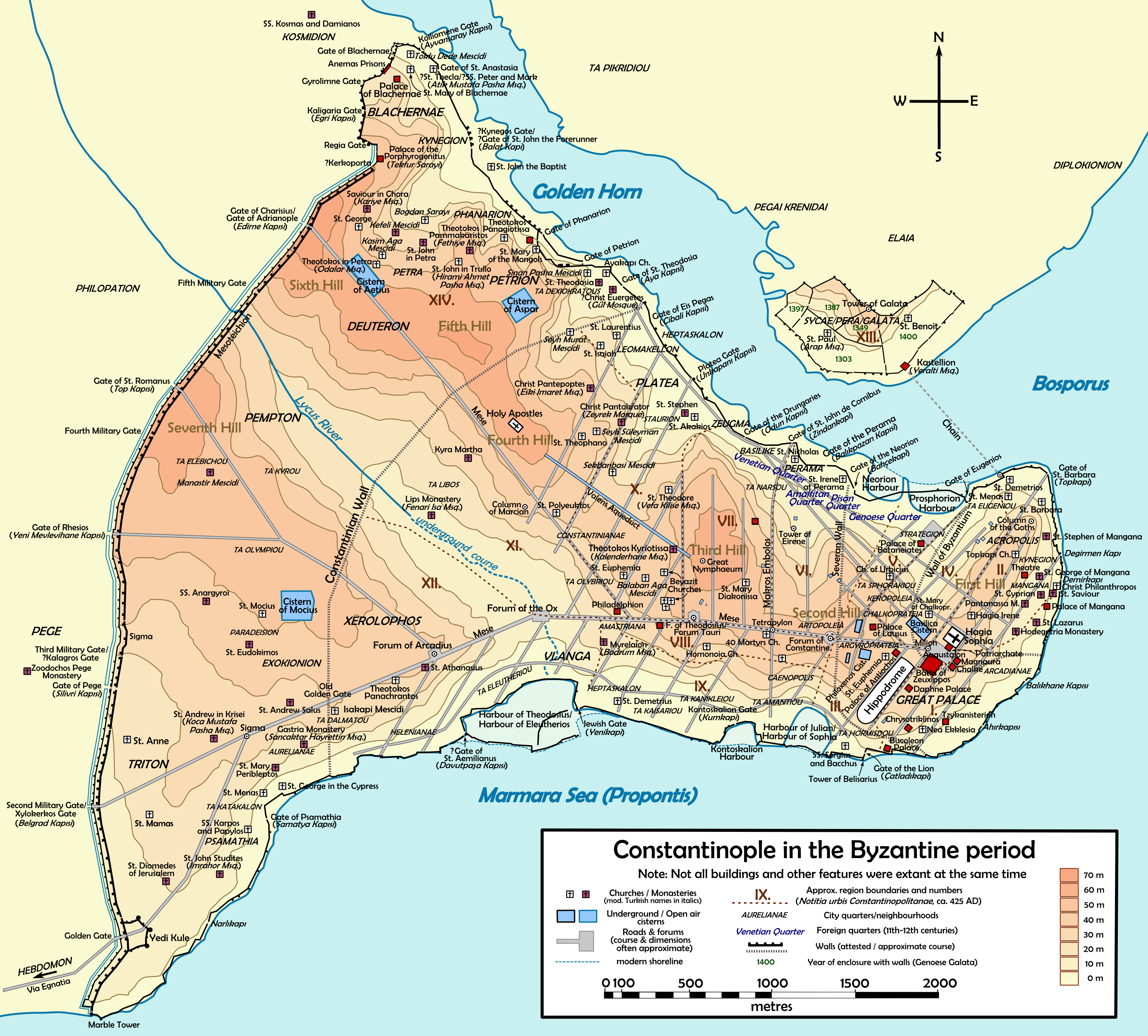
Map of Byzantine Constantinople

The Forum of Arcadius (Latin: Forum Arcadii, Greek: Φόρος τοῦ Ἀρκαδίου), was built by the Emperor Arcadius in the city of Constantinople, now Istanbul.

Built in 403, it was built in the Xerolophos area and was the last forum before reaching the Constantinian city walls and the Golden Gate in a line of forums, including the Forum of Theodosius, the Forum of Constantine, the Forum Bovis, and the Forum Amastrianum, built westward from the city center along the Mese.

The forum was later converted to a bazaar by the Ottomans, referred to as the Avrat Pazarı or "Women's Bazaar", which was mistaken with the Slave Market at Tavukpazari near Nur-u Osmaniye used for the auctioning of female slaves, otherwise known as 'Cariye', which technically during the period had a completely different social status than regular slaves. This practice was abolished in 1847 during Reshid Pasha's time possibly due to the British influence Slavery Abolition Act 1833.

The Column of Arcadius, located in the center of the forum, was decorated with spiral bands of sculpture in bas relief representing the triumphs of the emperor, like Trajan's Column in Rome. At the top of the column, which was more than 50m high, there was an enormous Corinthian capital surmounted by an equestrian statue of Arcadius, placed there in 421 by his son, Theodosius II. This statue was eventually toppled from the column and destroyed during an earthquake in 704. The column itself remained standing for another thousand years until it was deliberately demolished in 1715, when it appeared to be in imminent danger of collapsing on the neighboring houses. Now all that remains are the mutilated base and some fragments of sculpture from the column which are on display in the Istanbul Archaeological Museum.

== Bibliography ==
- Brian Croke, 'Count Marcellinus and his Chronicle', 2001
