= Notitia Urbis Constantinopolitanae =

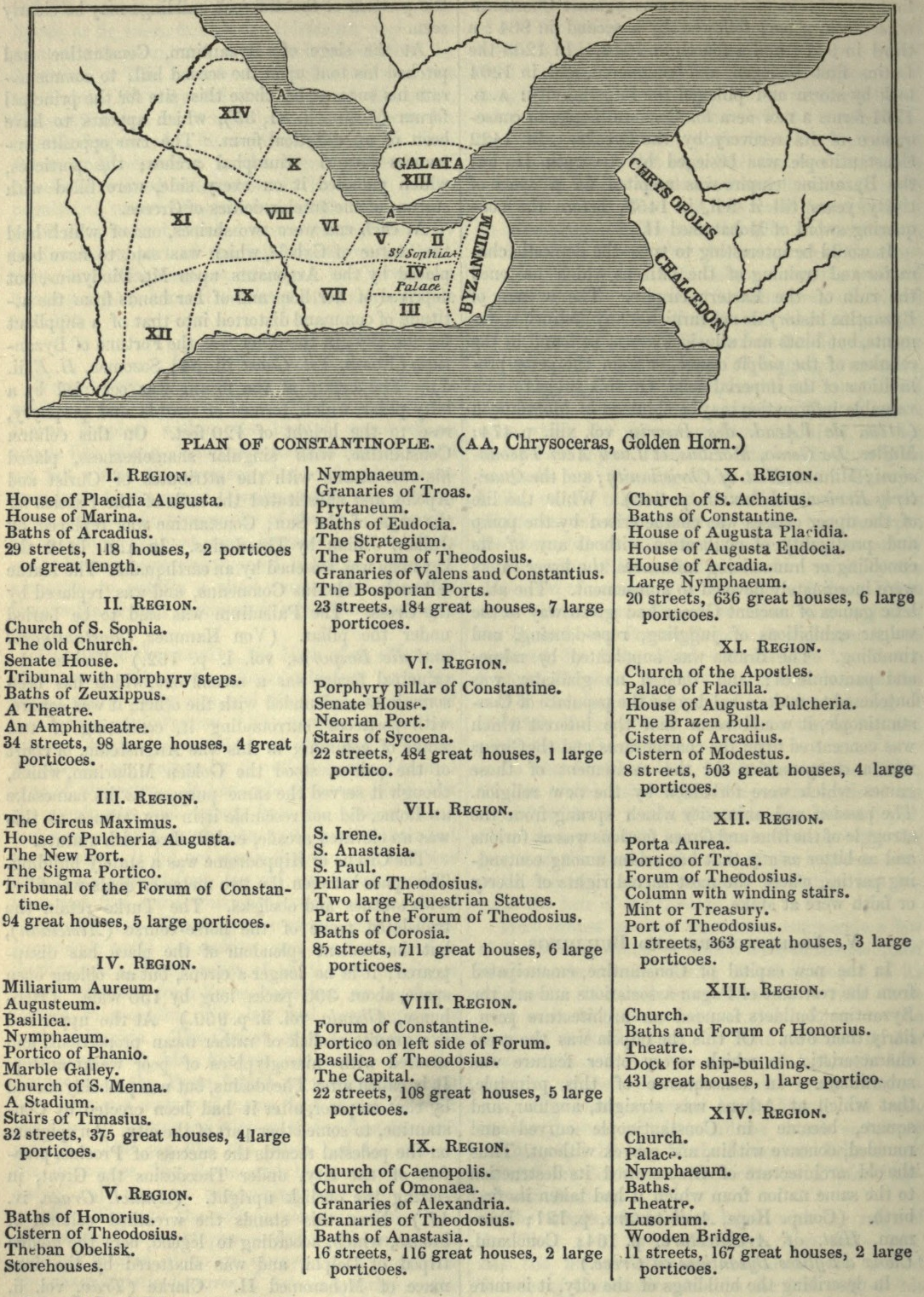
Map of the regions of the city according to the Notitia, including the major buildings present in each of them.

The Notitia Urbis Constantinopolitanae is an ancient "regionary", i.e., a list of monuments, public buildings and civil officials in Constantinople during the mid-5th century (between 425 and the 440s), during the reign of the emperor Theodosius II. The text lists the fourteen regions in which Constantinople was divided, along with the major public buildings such as fora, theatres, churches, palaces, baths and cisterns. It also lists the number of "houses" (domus), although there is uncertainty over the exact meaning of the term. Finally, the list includes the civil officials of each region, including the curators, the heads of the associations (collegia) and the heads of neighbourhoods (vicomagistri).

The Latin text of the Notitia Urbis Constantinopolitanae was published by Otto Seeck, as an appendix to his edition of the Notitia Dignitatum (1876). The first English translation by John Matthews was published in 2012 in the book Two Romes: Rome and Constantinople in Late Antiquity edited by Lucy Grig and Gavin Kelly. The Notitia Urbis was probably written between 447 and 450 and goes back to official sources. Although the simple lists are not always easy to understand, the Notitia Urbis helps to know what the city must have looked like before Justinian's building program.

== See also ==
- Parastaseis syntomoi chronikai
- Patria of Constantinople
- 14 regions of Constantinople

== Bibliography ==
- Matthews, John (2012). "The Notitia Urbis Constantinopolitanae". In Grig, Lucy; Kelly, Gavin (eds.). Two Romes: Rome and Constantinople in late Antiquity. Oxford: Oxford University Press. pp. 81–115. ISBN 978-0-19-973940-0. OCLC 796196995.
