= Forum of Constantine =

Forum/square in Constantinople

Coordinates: 41.009°N 28.971°E

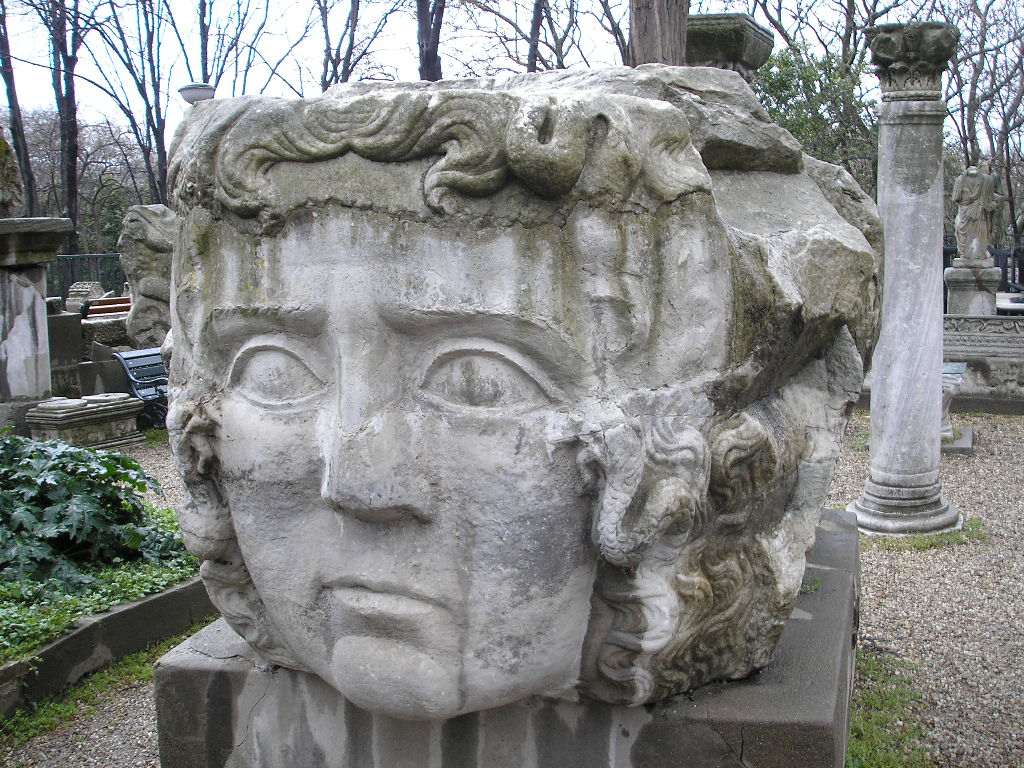
Keystone that was probably a part of the forum, kept at the Istanbul Archaeological Museum

The Forum of Constantine (Greek: Φόρος Κωνσταντίνου, romanized: Fóros Konstantínou; Latin: Forum Constantini) was built at the foundation of Constantinople immediately outside the old city walls of Byzantium. It marked the centre of the new city, and was a central point along the Mese, the main ceremonial road through the city. It was circular and had two monumental gates to the east and west. The Column of Constantine, which still stands upright and is known today in Turkish as Çemberlitaş, was erected in the centre of the square.

The column was originally crowned with a statue of Constantine I (3. 306-337) as Apollo, but a strong gale in 1150 caused the statue and three of the column's upper drums to fall, and a cross was added in its place by the Byzantine emperor Manuel I Komnenos (r. 1143-1180). Otherwise the forum remained nearly intact until the Fourth Crusade in 1203–1204. The city's first Senate House lay on the north side of it. It is known from the sources that the square was decorated with a number of antique statues, but it is impossible to determine their exact appearance and location.

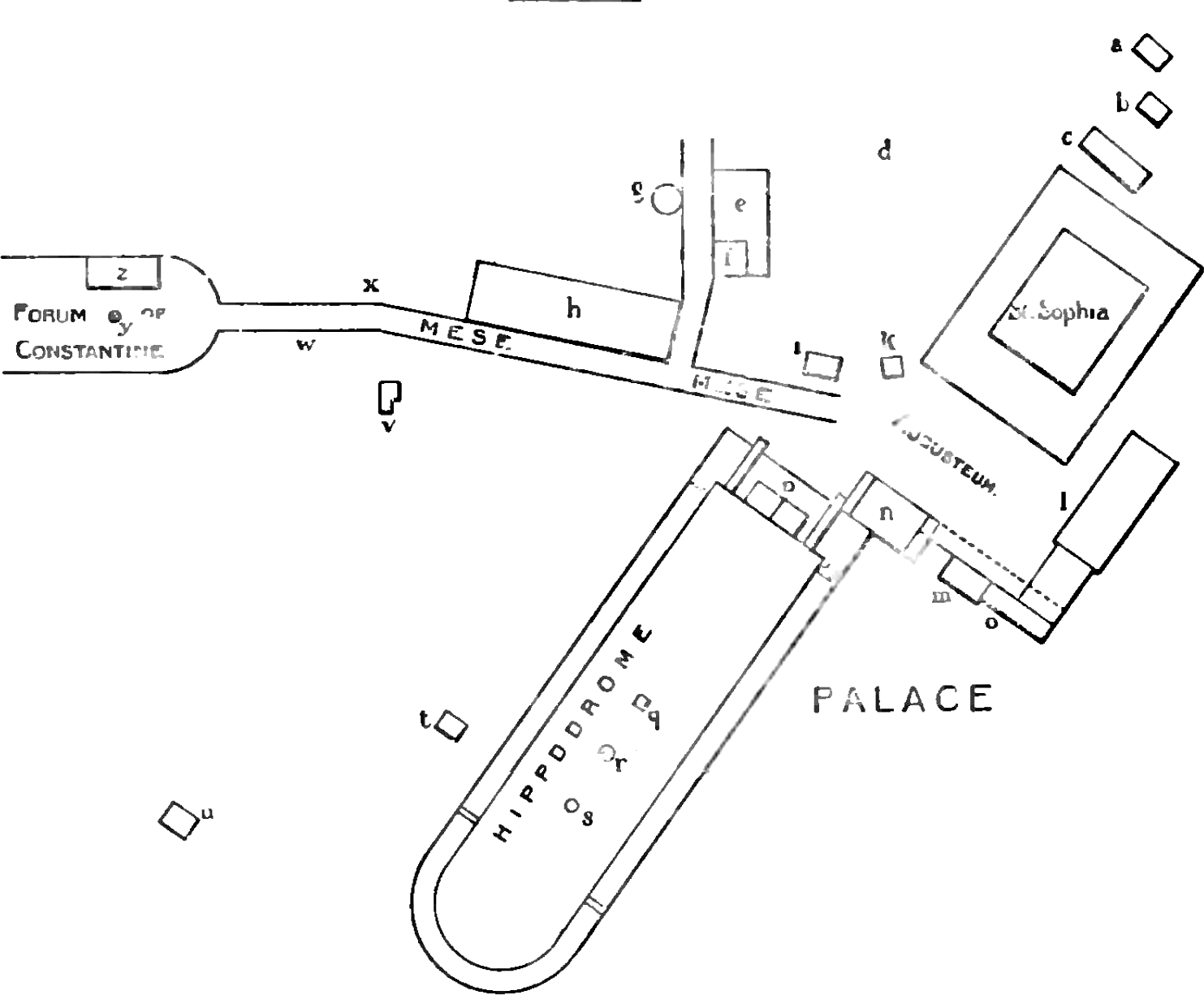
A map illustration of the Forum of Constantine and the surrounding area.

The Forum suffered major damage in a fire started by soldiers of the Fourth Crusade in 1203. After the Sack of 1204, the antique statues decorating the Forum were melted down by the Crusaders.

== See also ==
- Roman Forum
- Imperial fora
- Forum of Arcadius
- Forum of Theodosius
- Augustaion
