= Augustaion =

Square in Constantinople

Coordinates: 41.008°N 28.979°E

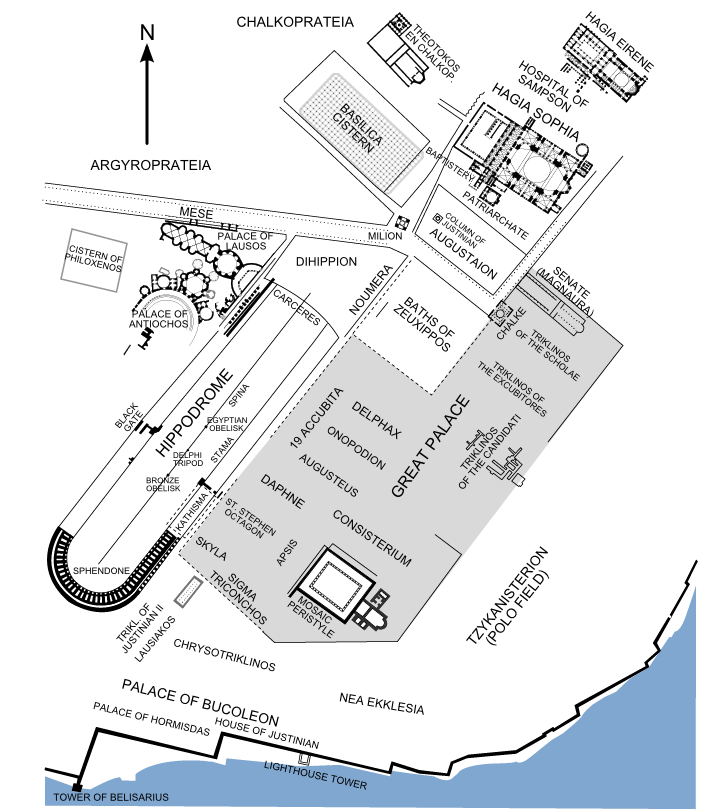
Map of the administrative heart of Constantinople.

The Augustaion (Greek: Αὐγουσταῖον) or, in Latin, Augustaeum, was an important ceremonial square in ancient and medieval Constantinople (modern Istanbul, Turkey), roughly corresponding to the modern Aya Sofya Meydanı (Turkish, "Hagia Sophia Square"). Originating as a public market, in the 6th century it was transformed into a closed courtyard surrounded by porticoes, and provided the linking space between some of the most important edifices in the Byzantine capital. The square survived until the late Byzantine period, albeit in ruins, and traces were still visible in the early 16th century.

== History ==
The square dates back to ancient Byzantium, before its conversion into an imperial capital by Constantine the Great. When Roman Emperor Septimius Severus (r. 193–211) rebuilt the city, he erected a large square surrounded by porticoes, hence named the Tetrastoon ("four stoas"). In the center of the square stood a column with a statue of the god Helios. In the 320s, Constantine adorned his chosen new capital with many new monumental buildings. His activities included new structures around the Tetrastoon, while the Augustaion was likely carved out of its eastern part at that time, and named after a Porphyry column supporting a statue of his mother, the Augusta Helena. The Augustaion was rebuilt in 459 under Emperor Leo I (r. 457–474), and again in the 530s, after being destroyed in the Nika riot, by Emperor Justinian I (r. 527–565). In its original form, the square was open to the public and functioned as the city's food market (agora), but after Justinian's reconstruction, it became more of an enclosed courtyard where access was restricted. Byzantine writers from the 7th century on refer to it as explicitly as a court or forecourt (αὐλή, αὐλαία, προαύλιον) of the Hagia Sophia.

Justinian's Augustaion survived mostly unchanged through the subsequent centuries. In the late 13th century, following the recovery of the city from the Latin Empire, the square and its adjacent buildings seem to have been the property of the Hagia Sophia. By the early 15th century however, the Italian traveller Cristoforo Buondelmonti reported that the square lay in ruins, and by the time of Pierre Gilles' sojourn in the 1540s, only the fragments of seven columns remained.

== Location and description ==
The Augustaion lay in the eastern part of Constantinople, which in the early and middle Byzantine periods constituted the administrative, religious and ceremonial center of the city. The square was a rectangular open space, enclosed within a colonnaded porticoes (peristyla in Latin, in English peristyles), probably first added in the 459 rebuilding and restored by Justinian. Its exact dimensions are impossible to determine nowadays; Rodolphe Guilland suggested that it had a rectangular shape 85 m long and 60–65 m wide.

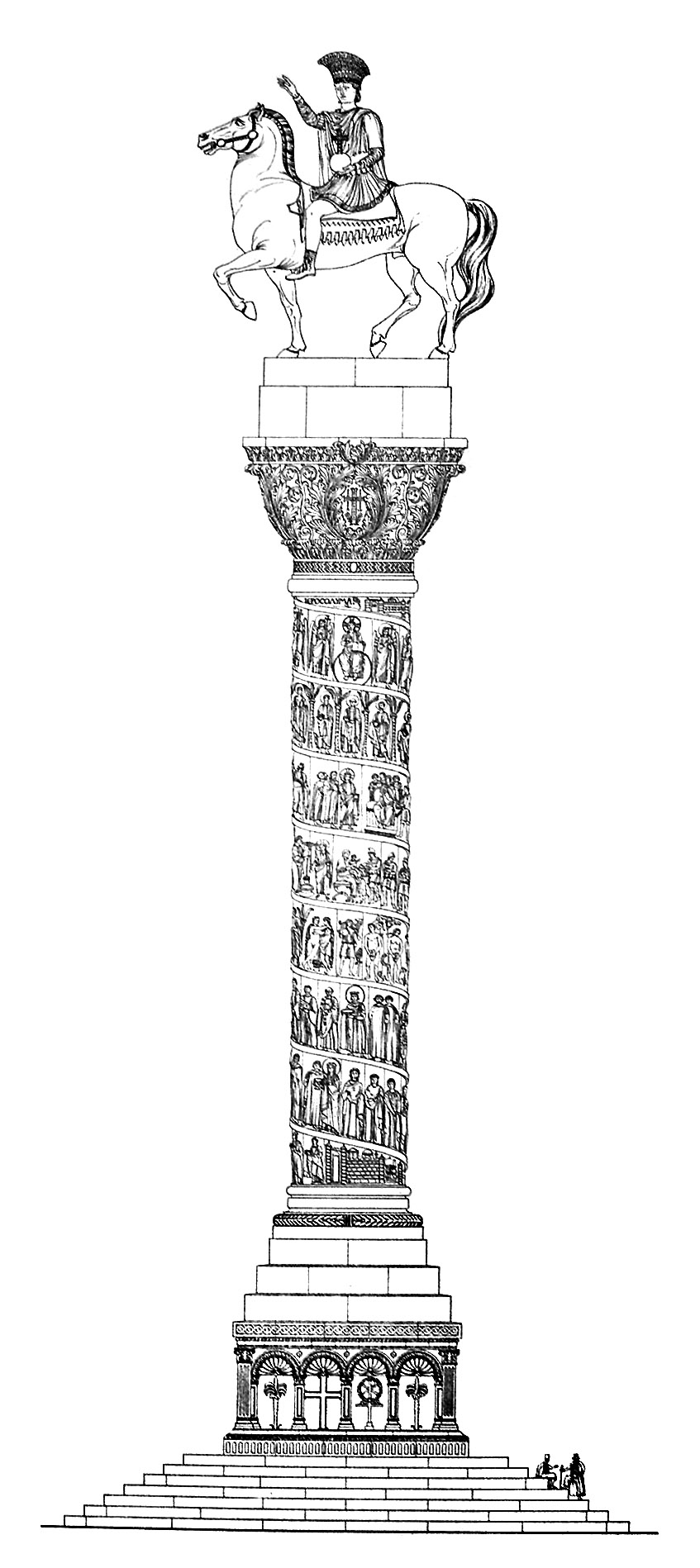
Reconstruction of the Column of Justinian, which dominated the square after the 6th century. The depiction of a helical narrative frieze around the column, after the fashion of Trajan's Column, is erroneous.

Enclosed on all sides, the Augustaion was entered in its western and southern side, respectively through the Melete and Pinsos Gates, from the Mesē, the city's main thoroughfare. Directly outside the square stood the Milion, the mile marker from which all distances in the Empire were measured. To its north, the Augustaion was bounded by the Hagia Sophia cathedral and the Patriarchal palace (Patriarcheion), to its east by one of the two Senate houses of the city, built by Constantine or Julian (r. 360–363) and rebuilt by Justinian with a porch of six great columns adorning its front. Next to the Senate, at the southeastern corner stood the monumental Chalkē Gate, the entrance to the imperial palace precinct, while to the southwest stood the great Baths of Zeuxippus and the northern end of the Hippodrome. In the 7th century, probably under Patriarch Thomas I (r. 607–610) a big three-aisled basilica called the Thōmaitēs (Θωμαΐτης) was erected on the southeastern side of the square. It was a reception hall associated with the patriarchal residence, containing also the Patriarchate's library, and survived until the 16th century.

The square itself was paved with marble, as discovered in excavations, and featured a number of statues, aside from the already-mentioned statue of the Augusta Helena. The 8th to 9th-century Parastaseis syntomoi chronikai record a statue of Constantine himself, standing on a column and flanked by statues of his three sons, Constantine II (r. 337–340), Constans (r. 337–350) and Constantius II (r. 337–361), to which were later added statues of Licinius (r. 308–324) and of Julian. In the reign of Theodosius the Great (r. 379–395), the ensemble was replaced by a silver equestrian statue of the emperor, standing on a column, and again flanked at ground level by statues of his sons, Arcadius (r. 383–408) and Honorius (r. 393–423). A bronze statue of Aelia Eudoxia on a column also stood on the square. The noise and pagan rituals that accompanied the statue's inauguration were criticized by Patriarch John Chrysostom, provoking the Empress' ire and his subsequent deposition and exile. The statue's base was discovered in 1848 and is now located in the garden of the Hagia Sophia. Following Justinian's rebuilding, the square's main feature was a tall column erected in 543 in the western end of the square to commemorate his victories. It was topped by an equestrian statue of Justinian himself, reusing parts of Theodosius' statue, and was complemented by a group of three barbarian kings kneeling before it and offering tribute. It survived until the 16th century, when it was demolished by the Ottomans.

== Footnotes ==
a: Also found in the sources as: Αὐγουστέων or Αὐγουστεών, Augousteōn; Αὐγουστίον, Augoustion; Αὐγουστεῖον, Augousteion, and hence in the corrupted form Γουστεῖον, Gousteion. The name first appears in Latin in the Notitia Urbis Constantinopolitanae of ca. 425.

== Sources ==
- Procopius, de Aedificiis, Book I
- Cameron, Averil; Herrin, Judith (1984). Constantinople in the early eighth century: the Parastaseis syntomoi chronikai (introduction, translation, and commentary). Brill Archive. ISBN 978-90-04-07010-3.
- Katsaveli, Olga (2007-11-07). "Augustaion". Encyclopedia of the Hellenic World, Constantinople. Archived from the original on 2014-04-26.
- Kazhdan, Alexander, ed. (1991). Oxford Dictionary of Byzantium. Oxford University Press. ISBN 978-0-19-504652-6.
- Paspates, A. G. (2004) [1893]. The Great Palace of Constantinople. Kessinger Publishing. ISBN 0-7661-9617-8.
