= Mese (Constantinople) =

Main road in the Byzantine capital

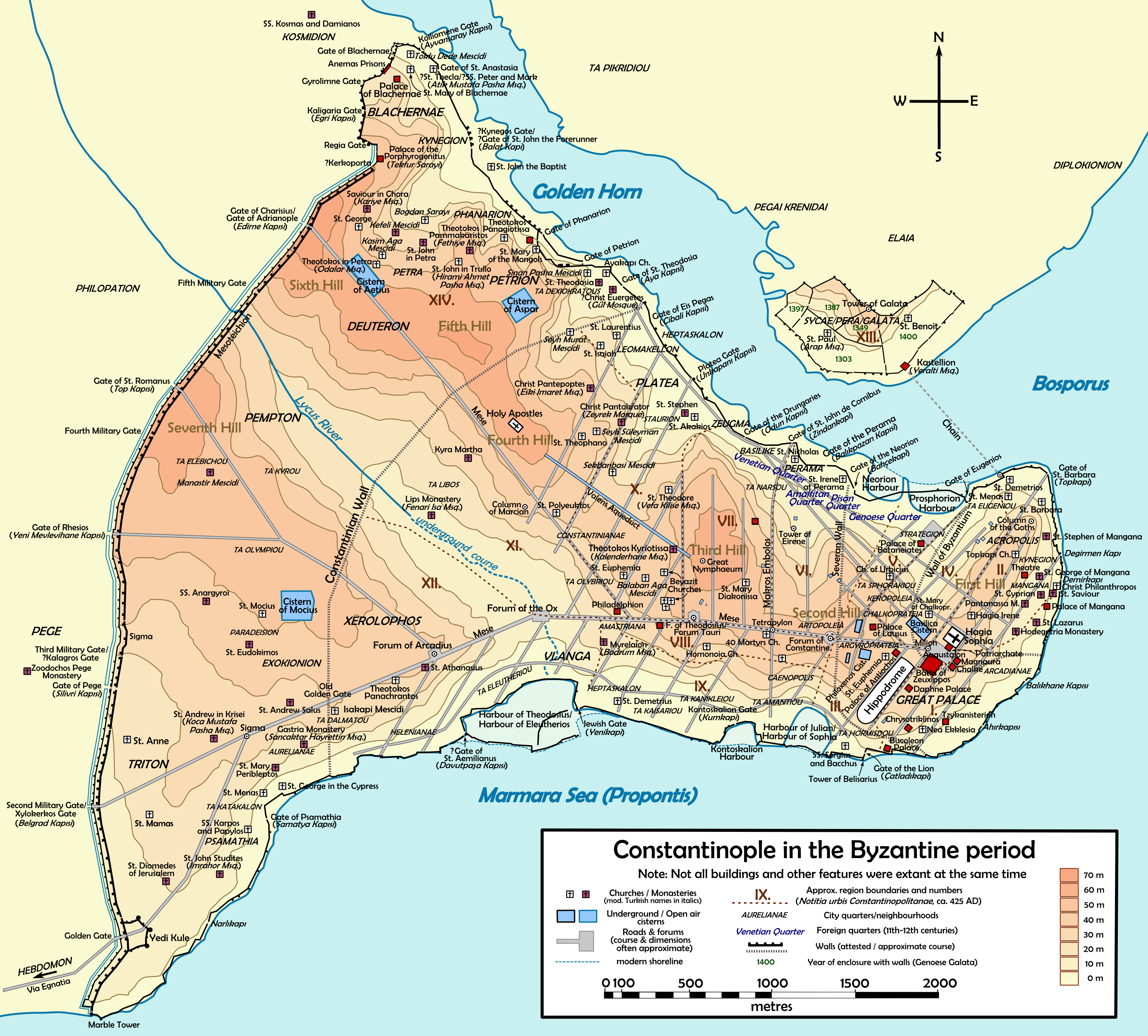
Map of Byzantine Constantinople

The Mese (Greek: ἡ Μέση [Ὁδός] i Mési [Odós], lit. "Middle [Street]") was the main thoroughfare of ancient Constantinople and the scene of many Byzantine imperial processions. Its ancient course is largely followed by the modern Divan Yolu ("Road to the Divan").

== Route of the Mese ==
The Mese started at the Milion monument, close to the Hagia Sophia, and led straight westwards. It passed the Hippodrome and the palaces of Lausos and Antiochus, and after ca. 600 meters reached the oval-shaped Forum of Constantine where one of the city's two Senate houses stood. This stretch of the street was also known as the Regia (ἡ Ῥηγία, "Imperial Road"), as it formed the original ceremonial route from the Great Palace and the Augustaion square to the forum of the city's founder.

From there, the street continued to the square Forum of Theodosius or Forum of the Bull (Forum Tauri), as it was also known. In about the middle of this stretch, the great mall known as Makros Embolos joined the Mese. At their junction stood a tetrapylon known as the Anemodoulion ('Servant of the Winds).

Shortly after it passed the Theodosian Forum, the street divided in two branches at the site of the Capitolium: one branch going northwest, passing the Church of the Holy Apostles, towards the Gate of Polyandrion, while the other continued southwest, through the Forum of the Ox (Forum Bovis) and the Forum of Arcadius towards the Golden Gate, where it joined the Via Egnatia.

The Mese was 25 metres wide and lined with colonnaded porticoes which housed shops. It was the route followed by imperial processions through the city at least until Comnenian times. The most characteristic such procession was the triumphal entry of a victorious emperor, who entered the city through the Golden Gate and followed the Mese to the Great Palace, while jubilant crowds lining the street would greet him and welcome the imperial army home.

== Modern route ==
As Byzantium went into decline so the Mese lost its importance. It was, however, revived after the Ottoman Conquest of Constantinople in 1453. Since the Ottomans chose to develop a new palace on more or less the same site as the Byzantines had done, the road leading from the Land Walls once again became important.

In the center of Istanbul, the street became known as Divan Yolu or the Road to the Divan, in recognition of the fact that dignitaries would process along it for meetings in the Divan inside Topkapı Palace (Topkapı Sarayı). So important was this road that to this day it is still lined with Ottoman monuments including mosques (Firuz Ağa Mosque), libraries (Köprülü Kütüphanesi) and the tombs of some of the sultans, including Mahmud II, Abdülaziz and Abdülhamid II.

As it heads west Divan Yolu becomes Yeniçeriler Caddesi (Janissary Street) and then Ordu Caddesi (Army Street). From Beyazıt Square, which stands at the site of the old Forum of Theodosius, the northwestern branch of the Mese is traced by several streets, but mainly Fevzi Paşa Caddesi; the southwestern branch continues to follow Ordu Caddesi until it crosses Atatürk Boulevard, at which point it primarily traces Cerrahpaşa Caddesi and Koca Mustafapaşa Caddesi southwest towards the old Theodosian Walls.

The modern Divan Yolu is lined with cafes, restaurants, hotels, bookshops and other amenities aimed at tourists. Of passing interest on the modern street is the Lale Restaurant which was, in the 1970s, the famous Pudding Shop that served as a gathering place for hippies heading for Kathmandu and appeared in the Alan Parker film Midnight Express.

The section of the former Mese east of Atatürk Boulevard (Divan Yolu, Yeniçeriler Caddesi, and Ordu Caddesi) is by served Line T1 of the Istanbul Tram, between Aksaray station in the west and Sultanahmet station in the east.
