= Neorion Harbour =

Historic port of Constantinople

Coordinates: 41°1′0″N 28°58′30″E

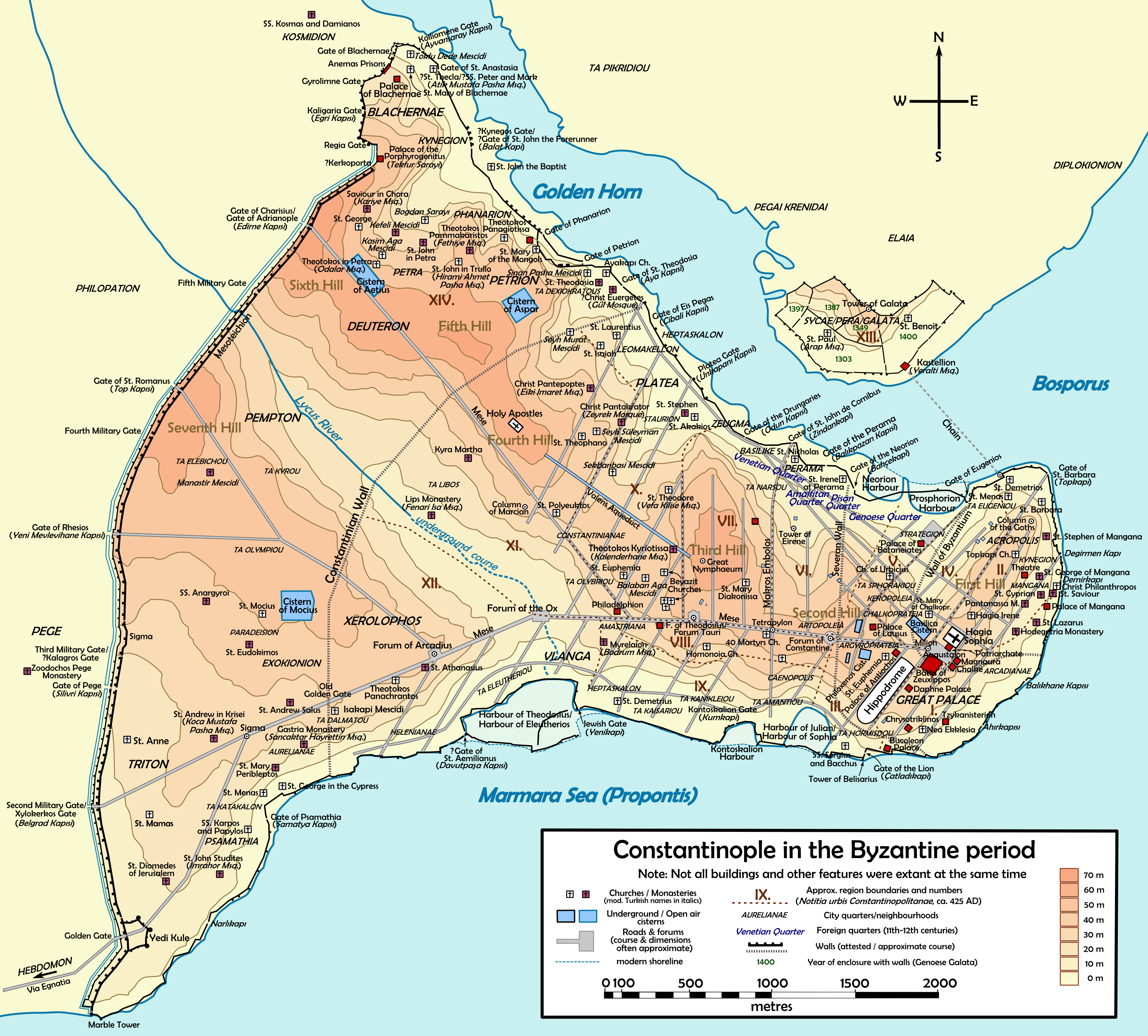
Map of Byzantine Constantinople. The Neorion is located in the eastern part of the city, on the southern shore of the Golden Horn, near its mouth into the Bosphorus

The Neorion Harbour (Greek: Λιμὴν τοῦ Νεωρίου or Λιμὴν τῶν Νεωρίων) was a harbour in the city of Constantinople, active from the foundation of the city in the 4th century until the late Ottoman period. It was the first port to be built in Constantinople after its re-foundation by Constantine the Great, and the second in the area after the Prosphorion, which was the port of ancient Byzantium.

== Location ==
The harbour lay on the southern shore of the Golden Horn, east of today's Galata Bridge, in the sixth region of Constantinople. In the Ottoman Istanbul this area corresponded to the Bahçekapı ("Gate of the garden") neighborhood, located between the customs warehouses and the Abdülhamit Medrese: today the site belongs to the Mahalle of Bahcekapi in Eminönü, which is part of the Fatih district (the walled city) of Istanbul. The inlet where the basin once lay is now silted up, and is presently occupied by the ferry terminals to the Bosphorus, Kadıköy and Üsküdar.

== History ==
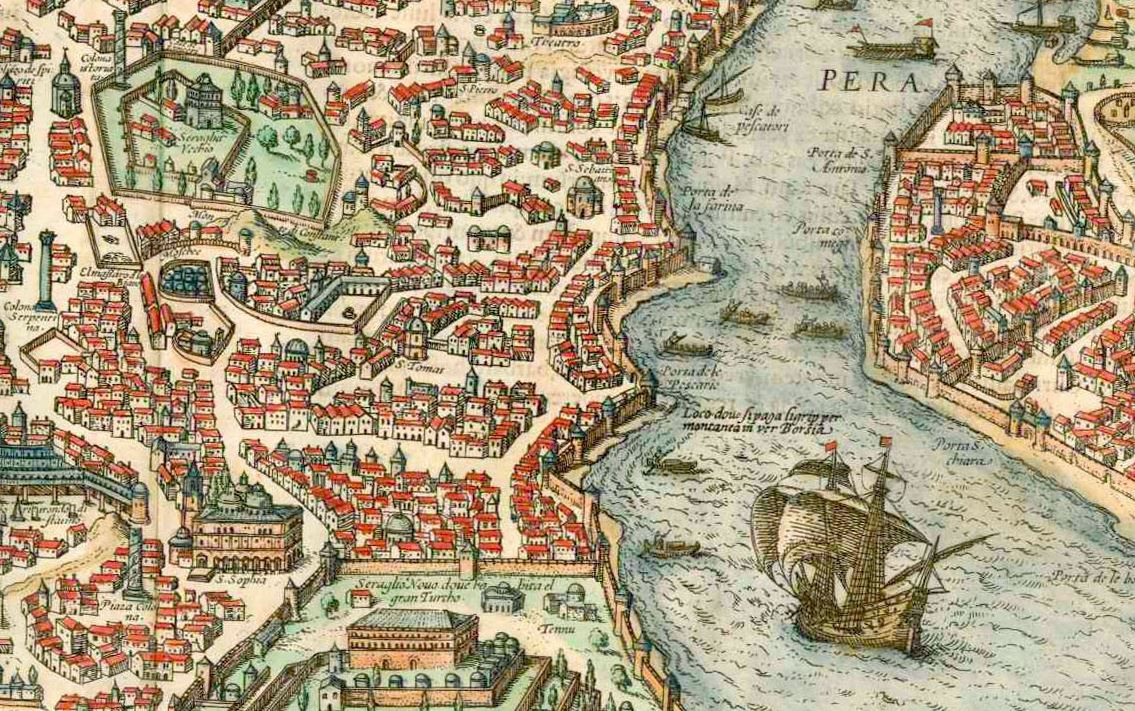
The Neorion harbour (second inlet from bottom along the left side of Golden Horn), from Byzantium nunc Constantinopolis by Braun and Hogenberg, 1572

The Neorion was the first harbour to be erected in Constantinople after its foundation, and the second in the area after the Prosphorion harbour, which existed already under the city's previous incarnation as Byzantium, and lay in the next inlet to the east, right under the northwest slope of the first hill of the city, in the quarter named "ta Eugeniou" (Greek: τὰ Εὑγενίου). Being placed on the southern shore of the Golden Horn, the Neorion was not subjected to the heavy storms provoked by the Lodos, the south-west wind blowing from the Marmara Sea; in addition, harbour silting was not such a big problem as for the harbours on the city's southern shore. In fact, entrance of sail ships into the Golden Horn was possible with all winds; the only wind which could create some problems and a light silting being the North wind. The harbour had the double function of commercial port and shipyard, and hosted also a factory producing oars (Greek: κοπάρια). Since the main activity of the harbour was trade, the area was surrounded by many storehouses. This fact is underlined by the many fires which ravaged the port quarter: in 433 all the storehouses burned; in 465 a fire started here engulfed eight regions of the city; and in 559 the warehouses burned again. According to a late tradition, St. Andrew the Apostle settled here and made the quarter the centre of his preaching when he landed in Byzantium. In 697 Emperor Leontios (r. 695-98) had the harbour cleaned from the mud, since the area was suspected to be a plague breeding ground.

The Neorion remained an important harbour for the city through the centuries, and when the Latin commercial colonies (and possibly also the Jews) settled there, acquiring the right to establish their port of call on the Golden Horn, the importance of the port grew. First of all, Venetians and Amalfitans settled to the west; then came the Pisans, who at the end of the 11th century established themselves in the densely inhabited area west of the port; finally, in 1155 came the Genoese, who founded their colony in an area lying south and east of the Neorion. In the 17th century, long after the transfer of the Genoese to Galata, on the opposite shore of the Golden Horn, part of the Jewish community settled in the quarter, living there until the middle of the 20th century, when the whole area was demolished to enlarge the coast road and create the square in front of the Yeni Mosque. Due to the Jewish presence in the area, in the Ottoman period the Byzantine Porta Neoriou of the sea walls changed its name to Çifutkapı ("Gate of the Jew"). At the time of their maximum expansion, the Latin staging areas extended quite a way west of Neorion, reaching the Gate of Bigla/Vigla (also named Drungarios gate, later the Ottoman Odun Kapı, "Gate of the firewood"). With the rise of Genoese power during the Palaiologan period, the overseas commerce migrated from Neorion to Galata, but after the fall of the city in 1453 and the subsequent decline of Genoa's trade hegemony, the harbour would regain and keep one part of the city's overseas trade until the late Ottoman era.

== Description ==
Along Neorion's waterfront lay a portico, named Keratembolin (Greek: Κερατεμβόλιν). The name derives from a statue erected on a bronze vault, which represented a man bearing four horns on his head. According to a legend, in the port area was also on display a statue of an ox which bellowed once per year, frightening the inhabitants of the neighborhood. Because of that, Emperor Maurice (r. 582-602) ordered it thrown in the sea. One part of the harbour was known as "the old equipment" (Greek: ἡ παλαιὰ ἐξάρτυσις), and hosted a shipyard: in this neighborhood lay the church of Saint Euphemia.

== Sources ==
- Janin, Raymond (1964). Constantinople Byzantine (in French). Paris: Institut Français d'Etudes Byzantines.
- Müller-Wiener, Wolfgang (1977). Bildlexikon zur Topographie Istanbuls: Byzantion, Konstantinupolis, Istanbul bis zum Beginn d. 17 Jh. Tübingen: Wasmuth. ISBN 978-3-8030-1022-3.
