= John Matthews (historian) =

British historian & academic (born 1940)

John Matthews FBA FSA FRHistS
- Born: 1940 (age 85–86)

Academic background
- Education: The Queen's College, Oxford (MA, DPhil)
- Thesis: The supporters of the Emperor in Western society in the age of Theodosius (1970)
- Doctoral advisor: Peter Brown

Academic work
- Discipline: Historian
- Sub-discipline: Ancient history; Ancient Rome; Late antiquity; Ammianus Marcellinus; Codex Theodosianus
- Institutions: Balliol College, Oxford; Corpus Christi College, Oxford; Faculty of Classics, University of Oxford; Yale University

John Frederick Matthews, FBA, FSA, FRHistS (born 1940) is a British historian and academic. Since 1996, he has been a professor of Roman history at Yale University, where he was also the John M. Schiff Professor of Classics and History from 2001 to 2014.

== Life and career ==
Matthews was born in 1940. He studied at The Queen's College, Oxford, graduating with a Bachelor of Arts (BA) degree in 1962: as per tradition, his BA was promoted to a Master of Arts (MA Oxon) degree. He went on to earn a Doctor of Philosophy (DPhil) in 1970. His doctoral thesis was titled "The supporters of the Emperor in Western society in the age of Theodosius". His supervisor was Peter Brown, then a fellow of All Souls College.

He held the Dyson Junior Research Fellowship in Greek Culture at Balliol College, Oxford, from 1965 to 1969, and was then elected an official fellow of Corpus Christi College, Oxford. He returned to The Queen's College in 1976, when he was elected a fellow. At the University of Oxford, he was also a lecturer in Middle and Later Roman History from 1969 to 1990, when he was promoted to a readership; he was promoted again in 1992, to a personal chair as Professor of Late Roman History. Matthews left both The Queen's College and the University of Oxford in 1996 to take up a professorship of Roman History at Yale University, where he was also John M. Schiff Professor of Classics and History from 2001 to 2014.

=== Honours and awards ===
Matthews was elected a Fellow of the Royal Historical Society in 1986, a Fellow of the British Academy (the United Kingdom's national academy for the humanities) in 1990, and a Fellow of the Society of Antiquaries of London in 1993. He was awarded an honorary Doctor of Letters (DLitt) by the University of Leicester in 2003. His book The Journey of Theophanes: Travel, Business and Daily Life in the Roman East (Yale University Press, 2006) won the 2007 James Henry Breasted Prize of the American Historical Association as “the best book in English in any field of history prior to CE 1000”. For his book From Byzantium to Constantinople: An Urban History (Oxford University Press, 2024), Matthews was a joint winner of the 2025 Podmore Book Prize for Late Antiquity, awarded by an independent international judging panel on behalf of the Virtual Centre for Late Antiquity.

== Publications ==
- Western Aristocracies and Imperial Court, A.D. 364–425 (Oxford University Press, 1975).
- (Co-authored with Tim Cornell) Atlas of the Roman World (Phaidon, 1982).
- Laying Down the Law: A Study of the Theodosian Code (Yale University Press, 2000).
- The Journey of Theophanes: Travel, Business, and Daily Life in the Roman East (Yale University Press, 2006).
- The Roman Empire of Ammianus Marcellinus (Johns Hopkins University Press/Duckworth, 1989; 2nd ed., Michigan Classical Press, 2007).
- Roman Perspectives: Studies on Political and Cultural History, from the First to the Fifth Century (Classical Press of Wales, 2010).
- Matthews, John (2012). "The Notitia Urbis Constantinopolitanae". In Grig, Lucy; Kelly, Gavin (eds.). Two Romes: Rome and Constantinople in late Antiquity. Oxford: Oxford University Press. pp. 81–115. ISBN 978-0-19-973940-0. OCLC 796196995.
