= Parastaseis syntomoi chronikai =

Byzantine Greek text about Constantinople

Parastaseis syntomoi chronikai (Greek: Παραστάσεις σύντομοι χρονικαί, "brief historical notes") is an eighth- to ninth-century Byzantine text that concentrates on brief commentary connected to the topography of Constantinople and its monuments, notably its Classical Greek sculpture, for which it has been mined by art historians.

== Content ==
The Parastaseis, dedicated to a doubtless imaginary "Philokalos", the generic "lover of beauty", are generally interpreted on the simplest level as a kind of tourist's guide to the curiosities of Constantinople, in the manner of the later guides to Rome, Mirabilia Urbis Romae and De Mirabilibus Urbis Romae. In Classical Greek, a description of a work of art is an ekphrasis, and when considered under this rubric, or compared with the later compilation of notes on Constantinople called the Patria of Constantinople, the Parastaseis fail to give an objective description. Instead, the reader is offered anecdotal narratives about the statues, which had become foci for legends and wonder-working objects themselves. "Statues were perceived on both the intellectual and popular level as animated, dangerous and talismanic," observes Liz James.

Few of these anecdotes were as extended as the first-person narration about a statue of "Maximian" in the theatre of the Kynegion, which fell upon the investigator's companion, killing him; the narrator, who had taken refuge in Hagia Sophia, was exonerated when a certain philosopher, Johannes, found a text attributed to Demosthenes, predicting that the statue was fated to kill a prominent man. The emperor Philippicus (reigned 711–13) then had the statue buried. Such anecdotes do not directly relate to the commonly attributed imperial motivations for displaying classical plunder, as manifestations of imperial splendor past, present and future, and may be too summarily dismissed merely as examples of Christian superstition concerning "idols".

Liz James reinterpreted the text as exemplifying Byzantine views of the daimones inhabiting such three-dimensional figural representations as potential sources of power, for those Christians who understood how to harness it. The objective assessment of a work of art was immaterial: what mattered to Byzantine writers was the "meaning" for which the statue served merely as a vehicle. With no sense of "Antiquity", the Byzantines did not distance themselves or their art from their classical Roman forebears, and had no sense that their interpretations of subject matter, often given Christian reidentifications, or the artistic style in which these representations were dressed, had drifted; by contrast, "we notice the distance that separates the Byzantines from the original meaning of pagan statues", given new identities as Christian figures or Emperors. More recently, Benjamin Anderson has argued that the Parastaseis represents an attempt by a group of self-styled aristocrats to claim the statues as repositories of secret knowledge about the future of the empire, and thus to gain leverage in their dealings with the eighth-century emperors.

== Critics ==
Its crabbed and elliptical Greek, full of solecisms, has made interpretation ambiguous. Though it is virtually the only secular text from the Byzantine age of eclipse that preceded the Macedonian Renaissance, surviving in a single manuscript, its modern commentators have not esteemed it highly: Alan Cameron found it "so stuffed with such staggering absurdities and confusions (especially where Constantine is concerned) that it is seldom worth even attempting to explain them, much less sift out the few grains of historical fact behind them." A reviewer of its modern edition even called it "the Byzantinist's Historia Augusta". Classicists have been frustrated in not being able securely to identify in Parastaseis the great sculptures of Antiquity that had been removed to Constantinople by Constantine the Great and his successors, and which continued to represent continuity with the classical tradition by their prominent presence in Constantinople's public spaces.

Fire and damage took their toll, but enough remained to form the subject of Nicetas Choniates's little pamphlet On the Statues destroyed by the Latins, in which Nicetas described the destruction of the remaining statues by the Latin crusaders at the sack of Constantinople in 1204.

== Bibliography ==
- Averil Cameron and Judith Herrin, eds., Constantinople in the Early Eighth Century: The Parastaseis Syntomoi Chronikai, Leiden, E. J. Brill, 1984.
