= Forum of Theodosius =

Roman forum and triumphal column in Constantinople (Istanbul, Turkey)

Coordinates: 41°0′35″N 28°57′49″E

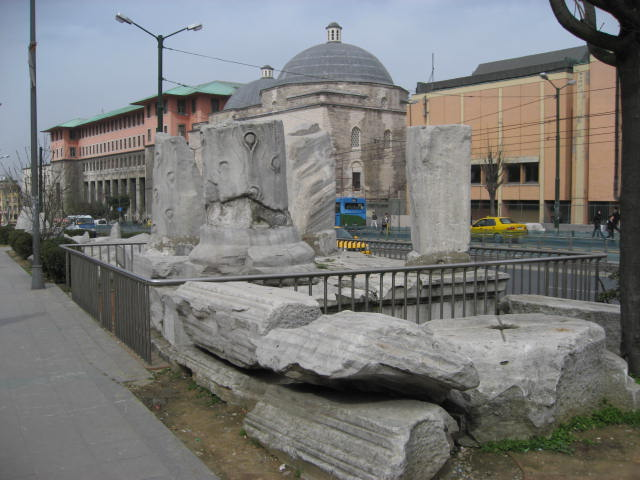
Probable remains of the Arch of Theodosius opposite today's Beyazıt Square

The Forum of Theodosius (Greek: Φόρος Θεοδοσίου, today Beyazıt Square) was probably the largest square in Constantinople and stood on the Mese, the major road that ran west from Hagia Sophia (Turkish: Ayasofya). It was originally built by Constantine I and named the Forum Tauri ("Forum of the Bull"). In 393, however, it was renamed after Emperor Theodosius I, who rebuilt it after the model of Trajan's Forum in Rome, surrounded by civic buildings such as churches and baths and decorated with a triumphal column at its centre. This forum should not be confused with the Strategion, a probably Hellenistic agora renewed by Theodosius I, lying near today's Sirkeci and also named after him Forum Theodosii.

== Column of Theodosius ==
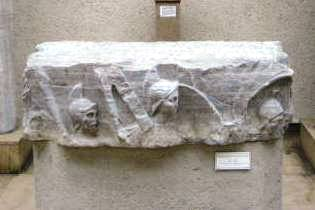
Marble fragment of monumental column to emperor Theodosius I

Somewhere in the forum stood a Roman triumphal column erected in honour of Emperor Theodosius I by his son Arcadius, who ruled as the Eastern Emperor after his father's death in A.D. 395. It probably stood in what is now the grounds of Istanbul University, on the north side of Beyazıt Square.

Its column, decorated with relief sculpture depicting this emperor's victory over the barbarians, was surmounted by a marble effigy. An internal spiral staircase allowed technicians to reach the top of the column (a stylite monk lived there towards the end of the mid-Byzantine period). The statue of Theodosius collapsed during the earthquake of 478 although the column remained standing. It had no statue until 506 when a new statue of Anastasius I Dicorus was erected instead. Emperor Alexios V was executed in 1204 by being thrown from the column. The column remained standing until the end of the 15th century, and some pieces of it were re-used in the construction of the Beyazıt Hamamı (Bath of Patrona Halil).

== Basilica ==
Excavations for the foundation trenches of the Faculty of Letters and Sciences of Istanbul University uncovered the remains of three basilicas. Their identities and names are unknown, and so they are called Basilicas "A", "B", and "C".

Basilica A is the only Justinianian-era (527–565) basilica whose plan is known. It had several distinct characteristics. Its central space was nearly square, with two side courtyards. The narthex on the west side connected with the courtyards. The intervals between the columns separating the basilica's naves were closed off by balustrade slabs. The capitals resembled those at Hagia Sophia, also built by Justinian. The large pulpit (ambo) found in Basilica A is one of the few surviving ambos from the early Byzantine period and is kept in the garden of the Hagia Sophia.

== Triumphal arch ==
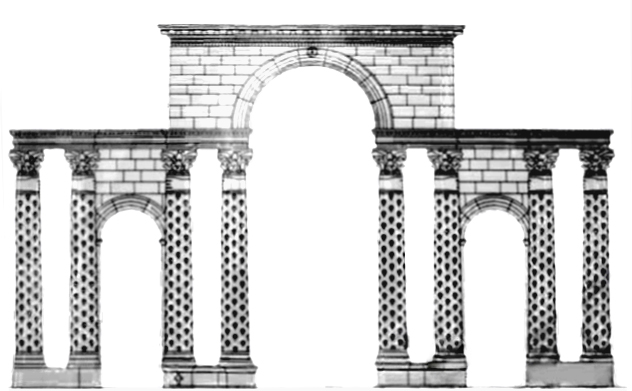
Reconstruction of the Triumphal Arch at the Forum, after Rudolf Naumann

A marble triumphal arch of Proconnesian marble was erected on the west side of the Forum. The triumphal arch had a vaulted roof with three passageways. The central archway was wider and higher than the other two and flanked by four-column piers carved in the form of Herculean clubs grasped by a fist. Built to mimic triumphal arches in Rome itself, it had a central statue of Theodosius flanked by statues of his sons Arcadius and Honorius on its top. Some assumed pieces of the Arch came to light between 1948 and 1961 when Ordu Street and Beyazıt Square were being redeveloped. They can be seen on the south side of Ordu Street, opposite the hamam.

Today, the main street beginning in Hagia Sophia Square runs to the west along basically the same route as the ancient Mese road, which formed the main artery of the old city. Having passed through Theodosius's triumphal arch, the Mese continued on to Thrace and the Balkan peninsula. The triumphal arch and the ancient buildings around it (to which surviving ruins in the area possibly belong) were destroyed as a result of invasions, earthquakes (the central arch and the statue of Arcadius collapsed in 558; the rest of the arch was destroyed by the Constantinople earthquake of 740) and other natural disasters from the 5th century onwards. They were completely destroyed long before the Fall of Constantinople in 1453.

== See also ==
- Roman Forum
- Imperial fora
- Forum of Arcadius
- Forum of Constantine
- Augustaion
- List of ancient spiral stairs

== Sources ==
- Marlia Mundell Mango (2000). "The Commercial Map of Constantinople". Dumbarton Oaks Papers. 54: 189–207.
