= Seven hills of Istanbul =

Turkish geographic features

Istanbul is known as the City on the Seven Hills (Turkish: Yedi tepeli şehir). The city has inherited this denomination from Byzantine Constantinople which – consciously following the model of Rome – was also built on the seven hills.

== The seven hills of Istanbul ==
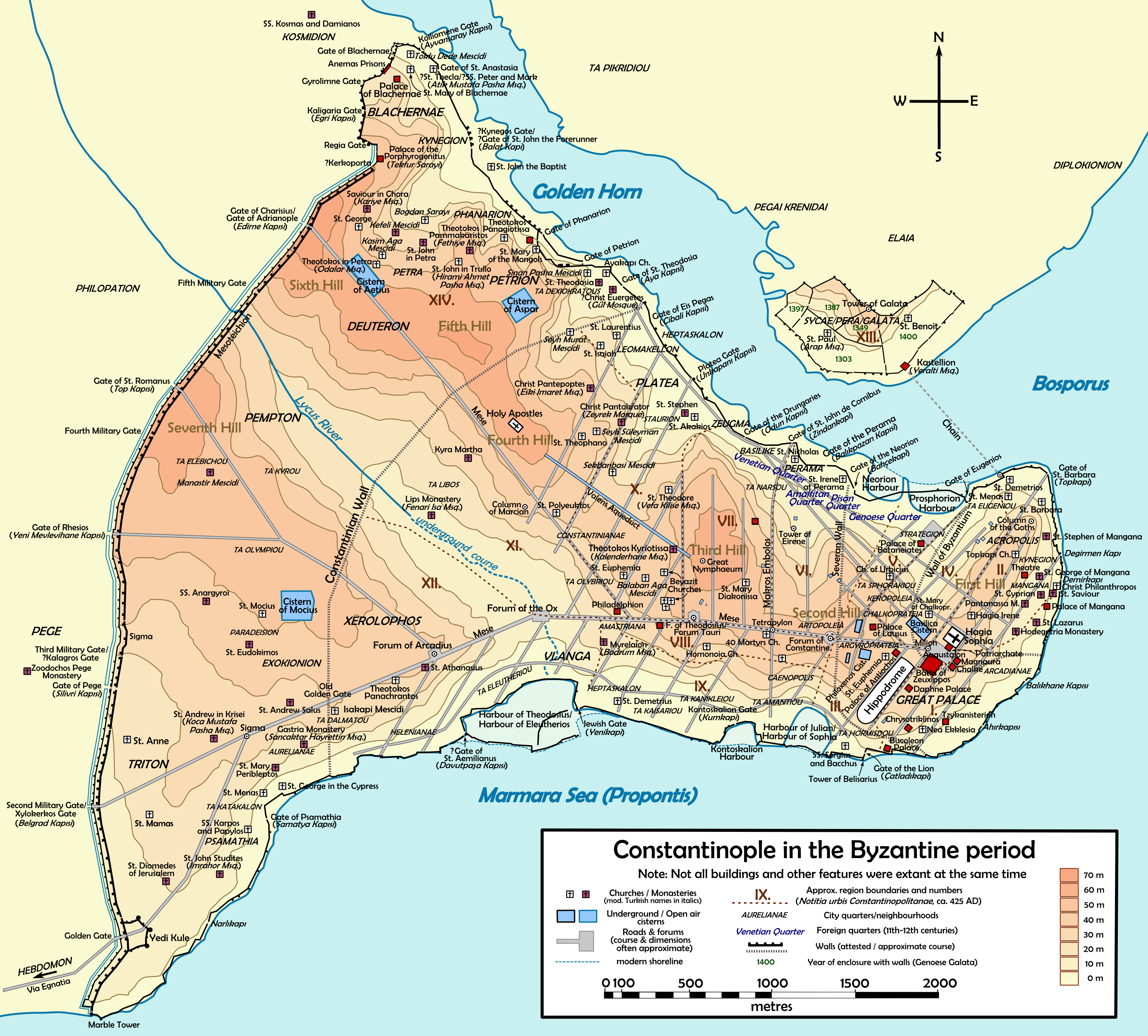
Map of Byzantine Constantinople with the hills names in brown

The seven hills, all located in the area within the walls, first appeared when the valleys of the Golden Horn and the Bosphorus were opened up during the Secondary and Tertiary periods. In the Ottoman Age, as in the earlier Byzantine period, each hill was surmounted by monumental religious buildings (churches under the Byzantines, imperial mosques under the Ottomans).

=== I^{st} ===
The first hill on which the ancient city of Byzantium was founded begins from Seraglio Point and extends over the whole area containing Hagia Sophia, the Sultan Ahmed Mosque and Topkapı Palace.

=== II^{nd} ===
On the second hill are to be found the Nuruosmaniye Mosque, Grand Bazaar and Column of Constantine. The second hill is divided from the first by a fairly deep valley running from Babiali on the east Eminönü.

=== III^{rd} ===
The third hill is now occupied by the main buildings of Istanbul University, the Bayezid II Mosque to the south and the Süleymaniye Mosque to the north. The southern slopes of the hill descend to Kumkapi and Langa.

=== IV^{th} ===
The fourth hill on which stood the Church of the Holy Apostles and, subsequently, the Fatih Mosque, slopes down rather steeply to the Golden Horn on the north and, rather more gently, to Aksaray on the south.

=== V^{th} ===
On the fifth hill is the Mosque of Sultan Selim. The fifth and the sixth hills are separated by the valley running down on the west to Balat on the shore of the Golden Horn.

=== VI^{th} ===
On the sixth hill is the Mihrimah Sultan Mosque. The districts include Edirnekapı and Ayvansaray. Its gentle slopes run out beyond the line of the defense walls.

=== VII^{th} ===
The seventh hill, known in Byzantine times as the Xērolophos (Greek: ξηρόλοφος), or "dry hill," it extends from Aksaray to the Theodosian Walls and the Marmara. It is a broad hill with three summits producing a triangle with apices at Topkapı, Aksaray, and Yedikule. It was divided from the rest of the city by the Lycus creek.

== See also ==
- List of cities claimed to be built on seven hills
- Seven hills (disambiguation)

== Bibliography ==
- Janin, Raymond (1964). Constantinople Byzantine (in French) (2 ed.). Paris: Institut Français d'Etudes Byzantines.
