= Patria of Constantinople =

The Patria of Constantinople (Greek: Πάτρια Κωνσταντινουπόλεως), also regularly referred to by the Latin name Scriptores originum Constantinopolitarum ("writers on the origins of Constantinople"), are a Byzantine collection of historical works on the history and monuments of the Byzantine imperial capital of Constantinople (modern Istanbul, Turkey).

Attributed in the past to the 14th-century writer George Kodinos, the collection in fact dates from earlier centuries: it was probably first compiled ca. 995 in the reign of Basil II (r. 976–1025) and then revised and added to in the reign of Alexios I Komnenos (r. 1081–1118).

The collection contains:

- a part of the patria of the 6th-century pagan writer Hesychius of Miletus, on the history of Byzantium from its foundation to the time where Constantine I refounded it as Constantinople.
- the Parastaseis syntomoi chronikai, which focuses chiefly on the antique sculptures of the city
- another set of patria dating to ca. 995.
- an anonymous Story on the Construction of the Hagia Sophia, written between the late 6th and the late 10th centuries, but more likely at some time in the 9th century.
- a topographical study dedicated to Alexios I.

From an archaeological point of view, the Patria are an invaluable record of the early history of Byzantium and the various monuments of Constantinople. However, their accounts must be examined with care, since they often mix facts with fiction and urban legends. From a political point of view, the Patria are interesting because of their treatment of the Emperors, who are relatively absent from the account of the imperial city, and are largely confined to a role as "chronological indicators".

== Patria in Persian Historiographies ==
To date, five Persian manuscripts concerning the history of Hagia Sophia's Construction have been identified in manuscript collections of the world. Of these, one is housed at the University of California Library, while the remaining four are preserved in the Süleymaniye Library in Istanbul. All five manuscripts are translations of the fourth section of the Patria of Constantinople, which recounts the construction history of Hagia Sophia. No other format or version—aside from this translated text—has yet been discovered in Persian that narrates the history of this church.

Although all translators of these texts, during the process of translation, have—out of necessity—added their own remarks regarding the rationale behind translating the Greek original, other buildings and figures of Constantinople, and events following the city's conquest by the Ottoman army, and have to varying degrees rephrased the original, their sympathetic approach to the Patria’s content has led them to preserve the sanctifying narrative of the church’s construction found in the Greek source. None of the translators have contradicted or challenged this sacred portrayal.

Among the three translations examined in this book, only the names of Darvish Shams al-Din Qaramani (author and translator of the first treatise) and Ahmad ibn Ahmad Munshi Gilani (author and translator of the third treatise) can be identified. The author of the second treatise has refrained from mentioning his name.

Darvish Shams al-Din Qaramani translated the text into Persian in 1129 AH (1717 AD), having rendered it into Turkish one year earlier. The second treatise begins with a brief preface, most of which is devoted to the author’s motivation for composing the work. Within this preface, without naming himself, the author recounts a short anecdote about his acquaintance—through a friend—with the Turkish translation of the Patria of Constantinople. Thus, the identity and biography of the author of this treatise remain unknown. The third treatise was authored by Ahmad Munshi Gilani, about whom no information is found in the sources.

== Sources ==
- Berger, Albrecht, ed. (2013). Accounts of medieval Constantinople. The Patria. Cambridge, Mass.: Harvard University Press. ISBN 978-90-04-07010-3.
- Cameron, Averil; Herrin, Judith (1984). Constantinople in the early eighth century: the Parastaseis syntomoi chronikai (introduction, translation, and commentary). Brill Archive. ISBN 978-90-04-07010-3.
- Kazhdan, Alexander, ed. (1991). The Oxford Dictionary of Byzantium. Oxford and New York: Oxford University Press. ISBN 0-19-504652-8.
- Mashhadi Rafi, Ali (2023). Persian Chronicles of Hagia Sophia. Orient Company. ISBN 978-625-8234-13-8.
- Nilsson, Jonas (2008). Masters of the Imperial City: Ideological perspectives on the Byzantine emperors of Patria Konstantinoupoleos (MA thesis).
- 1901 Teubner edition by Theodorus Preger at the Internet Archive volume 1
- 1907 Teubner edition by Theodorus Preger at the Internet Archive volume 2
