= Raymond Janin =

French priest and Byzantinist (1882–1972)

Raymond Janin, A.A. (31 August 1882 – 12 July 1972) was a French Byzantinist. An Assumptionist priest, he was also the author of several significant works on Byzantine studies.

== Major works ==
- La Thrace: Études historique et géographique (1920)
- Les Églises orientales et les rites orientaux (1922)
- Saint Basile, archevêque de Césarée et Docteur de l'Église (1929)
- Les Églises séparées d'Orient (1930)
- Constantinople byzantine. Développement urbain et répertoire topographique (1950); 2nd revised edition 1964
- La Géographie ecclésiastique de l'empire byzantine (1953)

== Sources ==
- "Notice biographique de Raymond Janin" (in French). Congrégation des Augustins de l’Assomption. Archived from the original on 17 June 2010.
