= Forum of the Ox =

Public square in Constantinople

Coordinates: 41°00′36″N 28°57′11″E

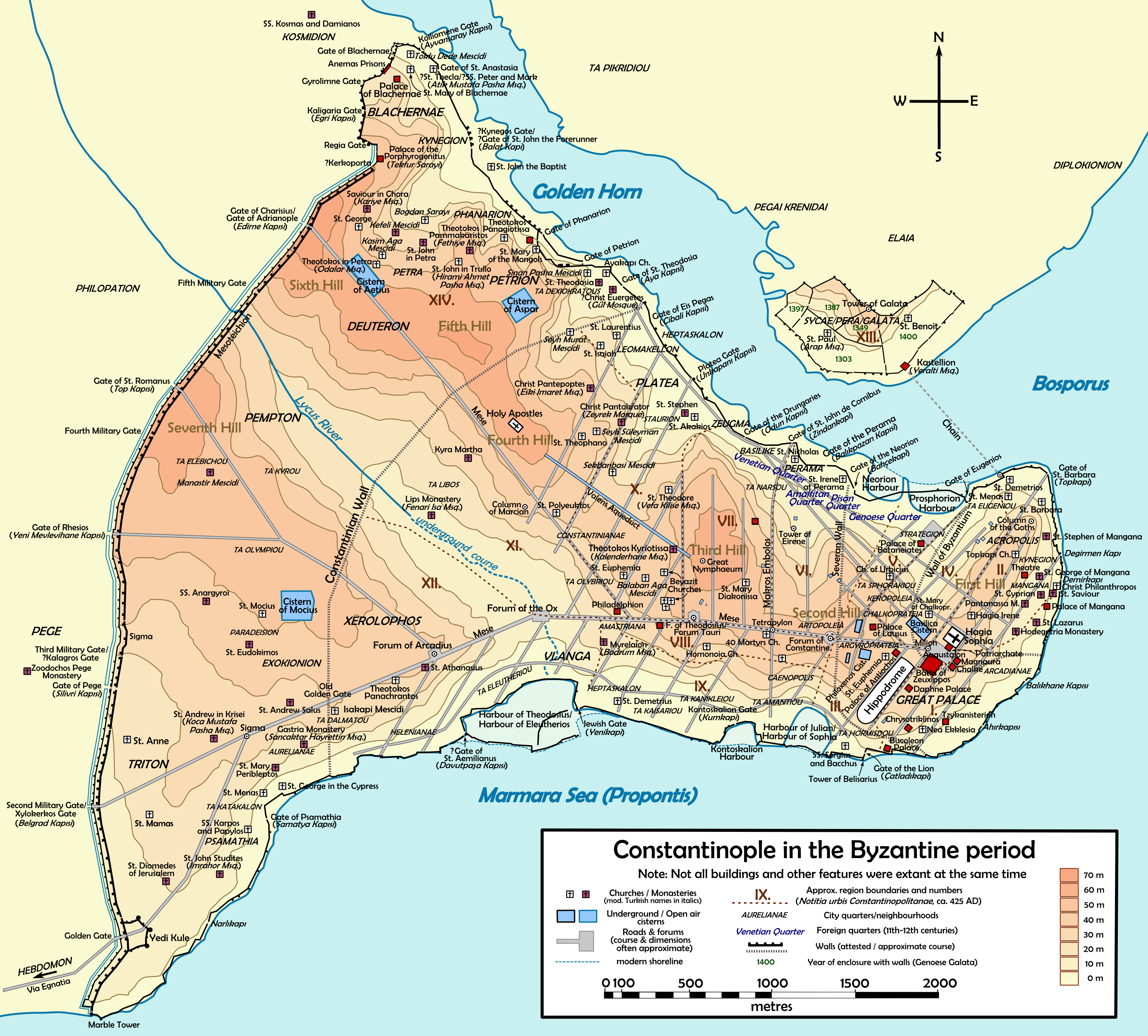
Map of Byzantine Constantinople. The Forum Bovis is located near the middle section of the sea walls, about 350 m. north of the Eleutherion harbor.

The Forum of the Ox (Latin: Forum Bovis, Greek: ὁ Bοῦς, meaning "the Ox") was a public square (Latin: Forum) in the city of Constantinople (today's Istanbul). Used also as a place for public executions and torture, it disappeared completely after the end of the Byzantine Empire.

== Location ==
The Forum lay along the southern branch of the Mese Odós (the main street of the city), in the valley of the Lycus creek, between the seventh and the third hills of Constantinople. Administratively, it was included in the eleventh Regio of the city, and its site is today located in the neighborhood of Aksaray.

== History ==
This square was possibly part of Constantine the Great's original city plan design; like the other fora of Constantinople, it was certainly built sometime in the 4th century. The name of the square originated from a large, hollow bronze statue representing the head of an ox. The statue, brought to Constantinople from Pergamum in Asia Minor, was used both as a furnace and a device implementing the brazen bull torture: people were closed inside the ox, which then was heated until they suffocated and burned. During the first persecution of Christians in Asia Minor under Emperor Domitian (r. 81–96) the Ox, still in Pergamum, was used to execute Saint Antipas. According to the Patrologia Latina, in the reign of Julian, the Apostate (r. 361–363) many Christians were burned inside the Bull, and at that time already moved to Constantinople. In 562 the Forum, at that time surrounded by warehouses and workshops, burned down. The body of the usurper Phocas (r. 602–610) was also incinerated in the ox's head following his deposition. According to some sources, Emperor Heraclius (r. 610–641) melted the statue to mint coins needed to pay his army for his war against the Persians. However, this is not certain since executions using the Ox continue to be attested after Heraclius's reign, for example, when Justinian II (r.685-695; 705–711) let burn in the Ox the two Patricians Theodoros and Stephanos, both involved in a failed plot against him. The same Emperor enlarged and adorned the square. During the Byzantine Iconoclasm, Saint Theodosia (d. 729) and Saint Andrew of Crete (d. 766), both defenders of icon veneration, were executed in the square. The former was executed by having a ram's horn hammered through her neck.

== Architecture ==
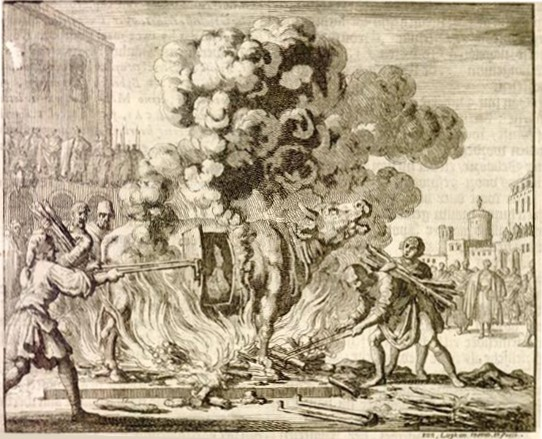
An idealized depiction of execution using the Brazen Bull in Pergamum

The position of the Forum Bovis is known thanks to the work De Ceremoniis, written by Emperor Constantine VII Porphyrogenitus (r. 913–959). He writes that the two imperial processions starting from the Great Palace and directed each year respectively to the Churches of Saint Mary of the Spring and Saint Mocius transited through the square. Based on this information, the Forum should be located in the modern neighborhood of Aksaray.

The Forum had a rectangular plan with sides 250 m and 300 m long. According to one source, in the 1950s its shape was still recognizable as a space limited to the north by 7–8 meters high terraces. According to others, the square should be located south-southeast of the Ottoman Murat Pasha Mosque. In the Byzantine Age, the square was surrounded by porticoes adorned with bas-reliefs and niches with statues. Particularly noteworthy among them was a group representing Constantine the Great and his mother Helena jointly holding a gilded silver cross, a composition that became very popular in Byzantine art.

Near the Forum lay also the Palace of Eleutherios (named so since it lay in the Byzantine community of ta Eleutheriou and overlooked the harbour of the same name on the Sea of Marmara), built by Empress Irene (r. 775–797), and a bath erected by the Patrician Nicetas in the reign of Theophilos (r. 813–842). The Forum Bovis was well connected with other important parts of the city: the Mese, heading east, connected the Forum with the Forum Amastrianum and the Forum Tauri. In the westerly direction, the same road started to climb the seventh hill, reaching the Forum of Arcadius and the plateau of Xeropholos. Finally, the Mese crossed the Theodosian Walls at the Golden Gate. This part of the road corresponds to the modern Istanbul roads Çerrahpaşa Caddesi and Kocamustafapaşa Caddesi. Two other paths connected the square with the gates of St. Romanus (modern Topkapı) and Pege (modern Silivri kapı).

The Forum's location has not yet been excavated. The quarter where the Forum lay was never hit by the large fires which ravaged Istanbul in the 19th and 20th centuries. In 1956, during the works for the construction of Millet and Vatan Caddesi, the two large roads which cross historic Istanbul, two pillars two meters high and having a base 3 m x 4 m wide were found outside the south wall of the Murat Pasha Mosque. These pillars, possibly belonging to a triumphal arch, were most probably part of the Forum. Moreover, single constructive elements were also found in situ during these excavations. In 1968–71, during the roadworks to build the Aksaray road interchange southeast of the Pertevniyal Valide Sultan Mosque, no remains of the square have been found.

== Sources ==
- Van Millingen, Alexander (1912). Byzantine Churches of Constantinople. London: MacMillan & Co.
- Mamboury, Ernest (1953). The Tourists' Istanbul. Istanbul: Çituri Biraderler Basımevi.
- Janin, Raymond (1964). Constantinople Byzantine (2 ed.). Paris: Institut français d'etudes byzantines.
- Müller-Wiener, Wolfgang (1977). Bildlexikon zur Topographie Istanbuls: Byzantion, Konstantinupolis, Istanbul bis zum Beginn d. 17 Jh (in German). Tübingen: Wasmuth. ISBN 978-3-8030-1022-3.
