= Amastrianum =

Public square in Constantinople

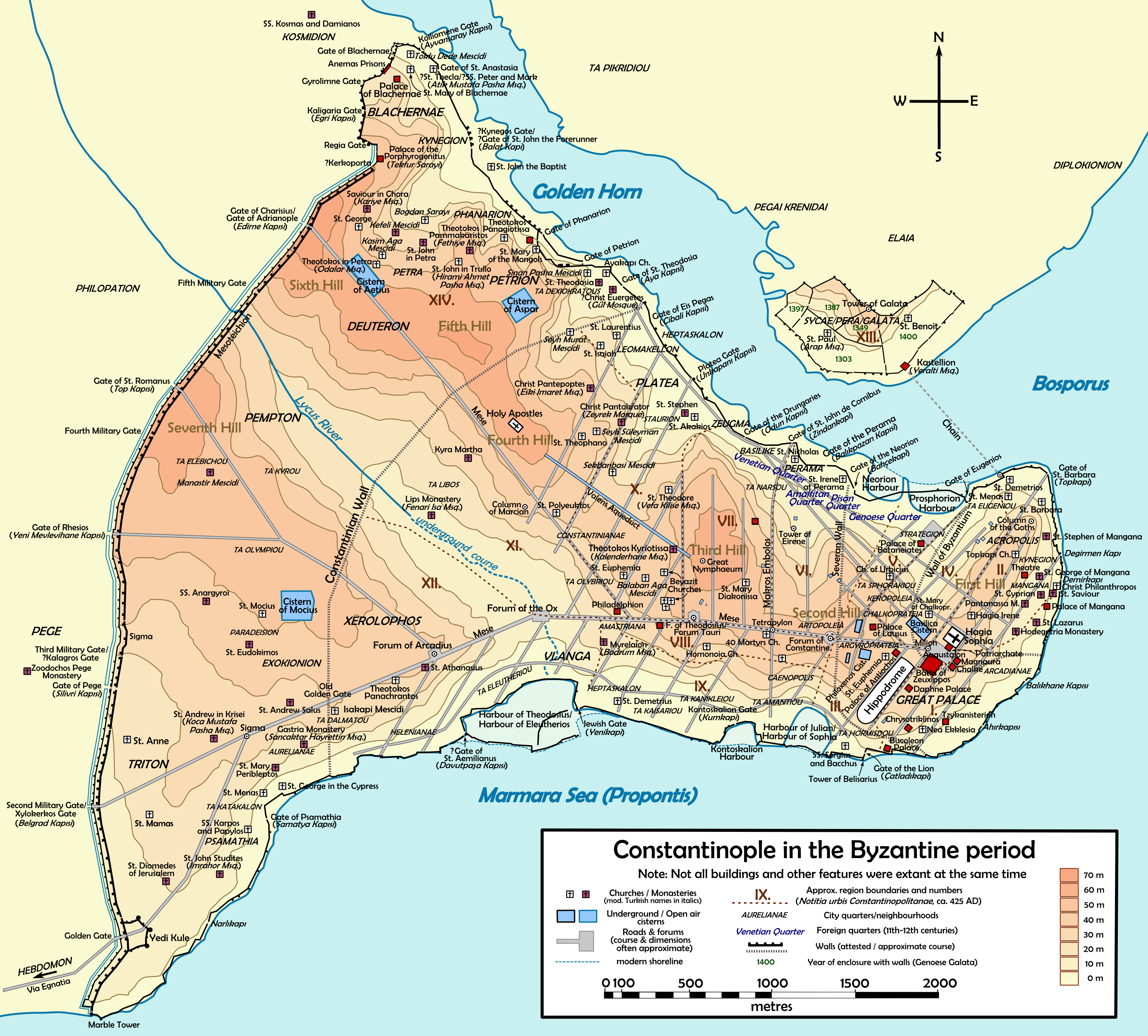
Map of Byzantine Constantinople. The Amastrianum is located near the middle section of the sea walls, northeast of the Eleutherion harbour and near the Myrelaion monastery.

The Amastrianum (Latin: Amastriánum, Medieval Greek: τά Αμαστριανοῦ, romanized: ta Amastrianoú), also called Forum Amastrianum by modern authors, was a public square (Latin: forum) in the city of Constantinople (today's Istanbul). Used also as place for public mutilations and executions, it disappeared completely after the end of the Byzantine Empire.

== Location ==
The precise location of the square is unknown: in the work De Ceremoniis, written by Emperor Constantine VII Porphyrogenitus (reigned 913–959), the square was located along the southern branch of the Mese odós (the main street of the city), between the Philadelphion and the Forum Bovis, both stations of imperial processions coming from the Great Palace and heading to the western part of the city. Because of that, the Amastrianum should have lain in the valley of the Lycus creek, between the seventh and the third hills of Constantinople, at midway between the modern neighbourhoods of Şehzadebaşı and Aksaray. According to another source, the square lay in a plain zone on the southern slope of the fourth hill of Constantinople, more or less where the modern roads Atatürk Caddesi and Şehzadebaşı Caddesi cross each other. Administratively, it was included in the ninth Regio of the city.

== History ==
No Byzantine source defines directly the Amastrianum as a forum, but from the context it is clear that it was a public square. Its name derived from the city of Amastris (modern Amasra) in Paphlagonia (a region on the Black Sea coast of north central Anatolia), either because someone from that city who had come to Constantinople for business was killed here, or because it was a place of execution for delinquents, and the Paphlagonians had a reputation for being criminals. According to the Patrologia Latina, the square hosted two statues, respectively of a Paphlagonian and of a slave of him, both always covered with litter and excrement. Indeed the neighbourhood had a very bad reputation, and witnessed several executions. Here Michael III (r. 842–867) let burn the exhumed body of the iconoclast emperor Constantine V Kopronymos (r. 741–775), and Basil the Macedonian (r. 867–886) burned the slaves responsible of having killed their master. In 932, Romanos I Lekapenos (r. 920–944) let burn at the stake here Basil the Copper Hand, who assumed the identity of the usurper Constantine Doukas to lead a rebellion in Bithynia. During the Byzantine age, the Amastrianum was also the centre of the horse trade in the city.

== Architecture ==
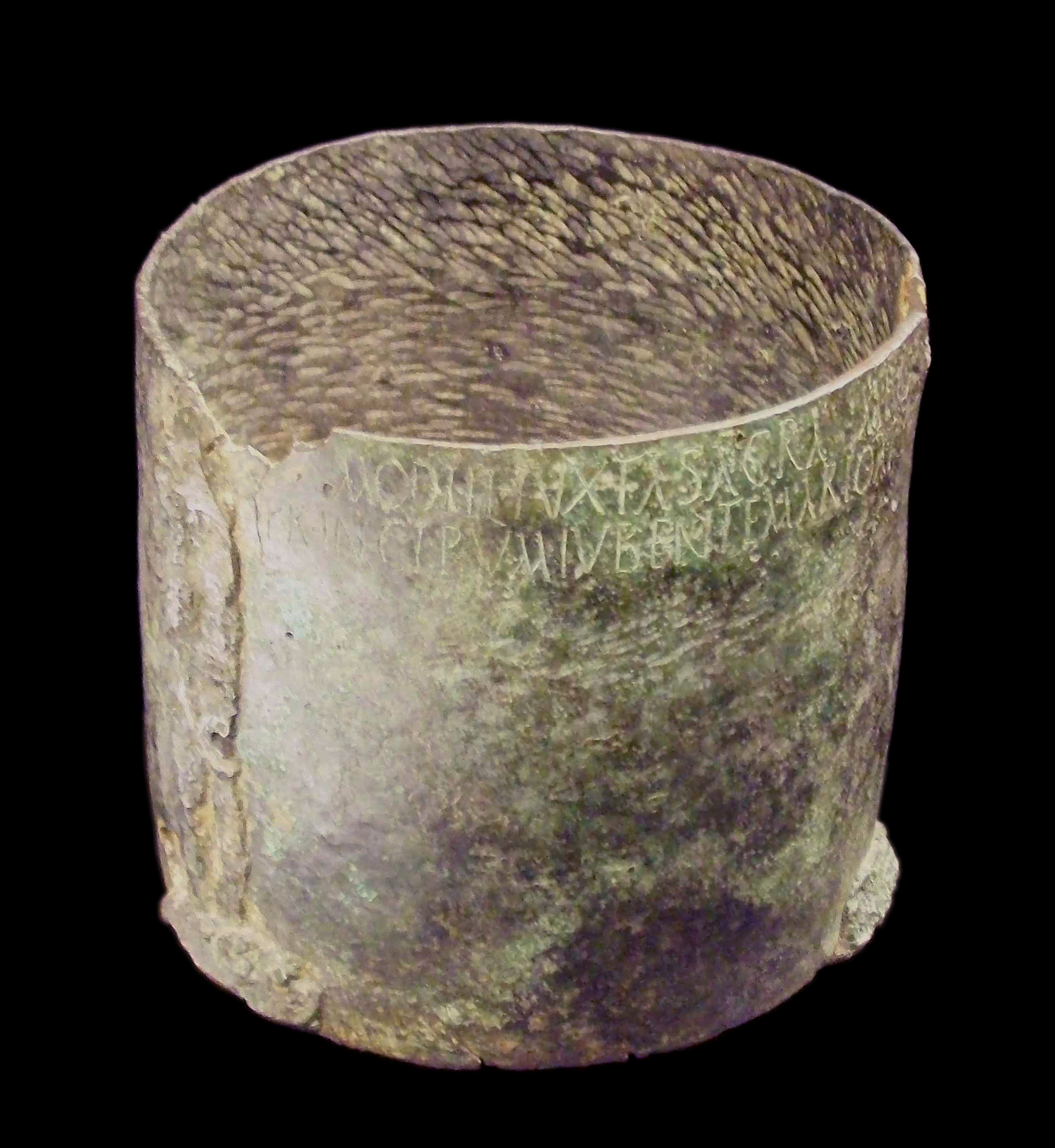
A bronze Modius measure (4th century AD). The silver exemplar exposed at the Amastrianum looked like it.

The forum is supposed to have had a rectangular plan. It was adorned with several pagan statues: among them, one of Zeus as Helios and one of a sleeping Heracles. Moreover, groups of turtles and birds, and 16 statues of drakes adorned the place. The square was delimited by a marble fence whose small columns were adorned with the crescent. The strange ornaments, together with its usage as execution place, spread among the populace the belief that the Amastrianum was inhabited by devils.

According to the Parastaseis syntomoi chronikai (a Byzantine Guide of the city written in the 8th or 9th century), in the square lay also the edifice named Modius (Greek: Μόδιον, pr. "Modion"). This landmark, built in front of the house of a certain Krateros, had a central plan with columns bearing a vault topped by a pyramid. The building hosted a silver exemplar of the modius, the largest Roman dry measure unit and was used above all in the cereals trade. The exemplar on display was supposed to represent the standard for this unit in the Byzantine Empire. The monument's façade hosted also two bronze hands set on spears. These were supposed to warn the wheat merchants against cheating using false measures: cheaters had their right hand cut off, as happened in the 5th century to two sailors accused of having swindled the Emperor while selling him cereals. The monument's location was not accidental: the square was not far from two horrea complexes related to the public grain supply from Egypt, the annona. These were the Horrea Alexandrina, 'Alexandrian warehouses' and the Horrea Theodosiana, 'warehouses of Theodosius', both placed near the Harbour of Theodosius on the Propontis. The Modius had been erected by Emperor Valentinian I (r. 364–375), who introduced this standard to Constantinople. A statue of him carrying a modius lay under the monument's vault. Over the years the original meaning of the bronze hands was forgotten and the place was actually used to punish criminals, often through mutilation.

The square's proposed locations have not yet been excavated.

== Sources ==
- Mamboury, Ernest (1953). The Tourists' Istanbul. Istanbul: Çituri Biraderler Basımevi.
- Janin, Raymond (1964). Constantinople Byzantine (in French) (2 ed.). Paris: Institut français d'etudes byzantines.
