= October 21 (Eastern Orthodox liturgics) =

Day in the Eastern Orthodox liturgical calendar

Eastern Orthodox liturgical calendar
October 20	October 21	October 22
October 21 O.S. ≍ November 3 N.S. October 21 N.S ≍ October 8 O.S.

An Eastern Orthodox cross

October 21 in Eastern Orthodox liturgical calendars is a feast day and a day of commemoration of saints and martyrs. Although some Orthodox churches use the Revised Julian Calendar and others use the traditional Julian calendar, the fixed commemorations for their respective October 21 are broadly the same, no matter which calendar is used. (Note: Despite the dates being the same, the days to which they refer typically differ by 13 days. The notation Old Style or O.S. is sometimes used to indicate a date in the traditional Julian Calendar (the "Old Calendar"). The notation New Style or N.S. indicates a date in the Revised Julian calendar (the "New Calendar").)

== Saints ==
- Hieromartyr Socrates, Priest, and Martyr Theodote, of Ancyra (c. 230) (Note: Name days celebrated today include: Socrates (Σωκράτης).)
- Martyrs Dasius, Gaius, and Zoticus at Nicomedia (303) (Note: "At Nicomedia, the birthday of the Saints Dasius, Zoticus, Caius, and twelve other soldiers, who, after suffering various torments, were submerged in the sea.")
- Saint Darius, Zosimus, Paul, and Secundus, martyrs of Nicaea by Diocletian (4th century)
- Martyr Azes, by fire.
- Saints Plantinos (Platinus), Irene and Marina of Raithu. (Note: His memory is recorded in the Jerusalemitic Canonarion (page 115), together with Saint Irene and Saint Marina of Raithu.)
- Venerable Hilarion the Great, of Gaza (371) (Note: "IN Cyprus, the birthday of the holy abbot Hilarion. His life, full of virtues and miracles, was written by St. Jerome.")
- The 63 Martyrs of Jerusalem (724):

- Pegasus, Neophytus, Acacius, Dorotheus, Stephen, Dometius, Herman, Dionysius, Epiphanius, Stratonicus, Leontius, Emmanuel, Theophilus, Elias, John, Samuel, Eulampius, Alexius, Photius, Eutrepius, Methodius, Chariton, Theophylactus, Anastasius, Andronicus, Symeon, Theoktistus, Romanus, Paul, Agathonicus, Minas, Athanasius, Jacob, Nicephorus, Porphyrius, Timothy, Irenarchus, Auxentius, Joseph, Gregory, Callinicus, Aaron, Cyriacus, Theodosius, Eustathius, Isaac, Alexander, Eleutherius, Adrian, Christophor, Antiochus, Isidore, Parthenius, Sergius, Euplus, Ignatius, Theophanes, Cyril, Zachariah, and Anthimus.

- Martyrs Andrew, Stephen, Paul and Peter, under Constantine V Copronymus (c. 741–775) (Note: In the Synaxaristes they are called "newly-revealed" Saints and were martyred under Constantine V Copronymus. Andrew was a monk from Crete, and after checking Copronymus, he was beheaded and buried in "the Judgment" (see October 17). The other three were probably monastics as well, since they staunchly defended the holy Orthodox Canons, and were also beheaded by Copronymus.)
- Venerable Martyr Zacharias, by drowning in the sea.
- Venerable Baruch, reposed in peace.
- Venerable Phillip
- Venerable Jacob, Oeconomus of Batheos Rhyakos Monastery. (Note: He is absent in the Synaxarion of St. Nicodemus. However his memory is recorded in the Synaxarion of Delahaye, without any biographical details, except for the following phrase: «Μνήμη τοῦ Ὁσίου Ἰακώβου τοῦ γενομένου οἰκονόμου τῆς Μονῆς τοῦ Σωτῆρος Χριστοῦ τοῦ Βαθέος Ρύακος, ὃς ὤρμητο ἐκ τῆς δευτέρας τῶν Καππαδόκων ἐπαρχίας».)

== Pre-Schism Western saints ==
- Saint Asterius of Ostia, martyred priest (c. 223) (Note: A Roman priest with Pope Callistus, whose body he secretly buried. For this reason he was cast into the Tiber at Ostia by order of the Emperor Alexander. Orthodox Christians recovered his body and buried it in Ostia where it is now enshrined in the Cathedral.) (Note: "At Ostia, St. Asterius, priest and martyr, who suffered under the emperor Alexander, as we read in the Acts of the blessed pope Callistus.")
- Saint Viator of Lyons, hermit (389). (Note: A disciple of St Justus, Archbishop of Lyon in France, whom he accompanied to live as a hermit.) (Note: "At Lyon, St. Viator, deacon of blessed Justus, bishop of that city.")
- Saint Ursula of Cologne and her companions, martyrs at Cologne (c. 451) (Note: "At Cologne, the birthday of the Saints Ursula and her companions, who gained the martyrs' crown by being massacred by the Huns for the Christian religion and their constancy in keeping their virginity. Many of their bodies were deposited at Cologne.") (Note: Early and famous virgin-martyrs in Cologne in Germany.)
- Saint Cilinia, the mother of St Principius, Bishop of Soissons and St Remigius, Bishop of Rheims (c. 458) (Note: "At Laon, St. Cilinia, mother of blessed Remigius, bishop of Rheims." She reposed in Laon in France.)
- Saint Fintan Munnu (Finian), of Teachmunnu, Ireland (635) (Note: A disciple of St Columba at Iona, he later founded the monastery of Taghmon in Co. Wexford in Ireland. In Scotland he is called St Mundus. He bore a terrible skin disease with great patience.)
- Saint Tuda of Lindisfarne, Bishop of Lindisfarne (c. 664) (Note: A monk from Ireland who succeeded St Colman as Bishop of Lindisfarne in England. He died of the plague within the first year of his appointment.)
- Saint Condedus (Condé, Condède), a hermit at Fontaine-de-Saint-Valéry in the north of France (c. 690) (Note: Born in England, he became a hermit at Fontaine-de-Saint-Valéry in the north of France. On hearing of the monastery of Fontenelle, he became a monk there and later preached Christ while living on an island in the Seine near Caudebec.)
- Saint Wendelin of Trier (Wendolinus, Wendel), a shepherd who was famous for his holiness and is venerated at St Wendel on the Nahe in the west of Germany (7th century) (Note: "S. Wendelin is thought, without evidence, to have been of Scottish or Irish origin, and to have been a shepherd in the diocese of Treves. A great deal of fable has been told about him, as that he was the son of a Scottish king, who sent him to Treves to keep swine, because he was so fond of reading the psalter and praying in churches. All that is really known of him is that he was a pious shepherd, and that miracles were believed to be wrought over his body, which reposes at S. Wendel on the Nahe. A great fire broke out at Saarbruck in 1417, which was extinguished after invocation of S. Wendel, whereupon he became generally famous. He is represented as a shepherd or swineherd.")
- Saint Malathgen of Cluain-Edneach, Ireland, Abbot (767)
- Saint Hugh of Ambronay, third Abbot of Ambronay Abbey near Belley in France (9th–10th centuries)
- Saint Maurontus, Abbot of St Victor at Marseilles, he became bishop of the same city around 767 (c. 804)

== Post-Schism Orthodox saints ==
- Saint Hilarion of Kiev, the first non-Greek Metropolitan of Kiev (c. 1055)
- Venerable Hilarion the Schemamonk of the Kiev Caves (11th century)
- Venerables Barnabas and Hilarion the Wonderworkers, of Peristerona, Cyprus, of the "300 Allemagne Saints" in Cyprus (12th century) (Note: The 300 Allemagne Saints came to Cyprus from Palestine, and lived as ascetics in various parts of the island. According to some of their lives in the Great Synaxaristes, after the dissolution of the Second Crusade (1147–1149), they decided to live the monastic life in the Jordan desert. However since the Latins there disturbed them, they relocated to Cyprus and dispersed over the island.)
- Venerable Philotheus of Neapolis and Mt. Athos (14th century)
- Saints Theophilus and James, monks of Konevits, founders of Dormition Monastery at Omutch (modern-day Feofilova Pustyn'),^{(ru)} Pskov (c. 1412)
- Saint Hilarion, founder of Pskovoezersk Monastery, Gdov (1476) (Note: See: (in Russian) Иларион Гдовский. Википе́дия. (Russian Wikipedia).)
- Saints Bessarion (Sarai), Hieromonk (1745), (Note: See: (in Romanian) Visarion Sarai. Wikipedia. (Romanian Wikipedia).) and Sophronius of Ciorara, monk (c. 1765), (Note: See: (in Romanian) Sofronie de la Cioara. Wikipedia. (Romanian Wikipedia).) Confessors, and St. Oprea of Săliște (18th century), martyred by the Latins in Romania.
- New Martyr John of Monemvasia, Peloponnesus, at Larissa (1773)
- Hieroconfessors John of Galёs, (Note: See: (in Romanian) Ioan din Galeș. Wikipedia. (Romanian Wikipedia).) and Moses (Macinic), Priests, of Sibiel, Transylvania (18th century)

=== New Martyrs and Confessors ===
- New Hieromartyr Alexis (Bui), Bishop of Voronezh (1930) (Note: See: (in Russian) Алексий (Буй). Википе́дия. (Russian Wikipedia).) (see also: February 12)
- New Hieromartyrs Paulinus (Kroshechkin), Archbishop of Mogilev, (Note: See: (in Russian) Павлин (Крошечкин). Википе́дия. (Russian Wikipedia).) and Arcadius (Yershov), Bishop of Ekaterinburg, (Note: See: (in Russian) Аркадий (Ершов). Википе́дия. (Russian Wikipedia).) and with them Anatole Levitsky and Nicander Chernelevsky, Priests, and New Martyr Cyprian Annikov (1937)
- New Hieromartyr Damian (Voskresensky), Archbishop of Kursk (1937) (Note: See: (in Russian) Дамиан (Воскресенский). Википе́дия. (Russian Wikipedia).)
- New Hieromartyrs Constantine Chekalov, Sergius Smirnov, Basil Nikolsky, Theodore Belyaev, Vladimir Vvedensky, (Note: See: (in Russian) Введенский, Владимир Дмитриевич. Википе́дия. (Russian Wikipedia).) Nicholas Raevsky, John Kozyrev, Basil Kozyrev, Alexander Bogoyavlensky, Demetrius Troitsky, and Alexis Moskvin, Priests, and Sergius Kazansky and John Melnitsky, Deacons, all of the Tver diocese (1937)
- New Hieromartyrs Neophytus (Osipov), Archimandrite, of Moscow, (Note: See: (in Russian) Неофит (Осипов). Википе́дия. (Russian Wikipedia).) and Sophronius (Nesmeyanov), Hieromonk, of Lozeva, Tver (1937)
- New Virgin-Martyr Pelagia Testovoy (1944)

== Other commemorations ==
- Translation of the relics of St. Christodoulos the Wonderworker of Patmos (1093) (Note: His feast day is on March 16.)
- Translation of the relics (1206) of St. Hilarion, Bishop of Meglin, Bulgaria (1164)
- Repose of Schema-Archimandrite Herman (Bogdanov) of New Valaam Monastery in Siberia (1938)
- Repose of Schema-Nun Seraphima (Bobkova) of Shamordino Convent (1990)

== Icon gallery ==
Hieromartyr Socrates, Priest, and Martyr Theodote, of Ancyra.
(Menologion of Basil II, 10th century).

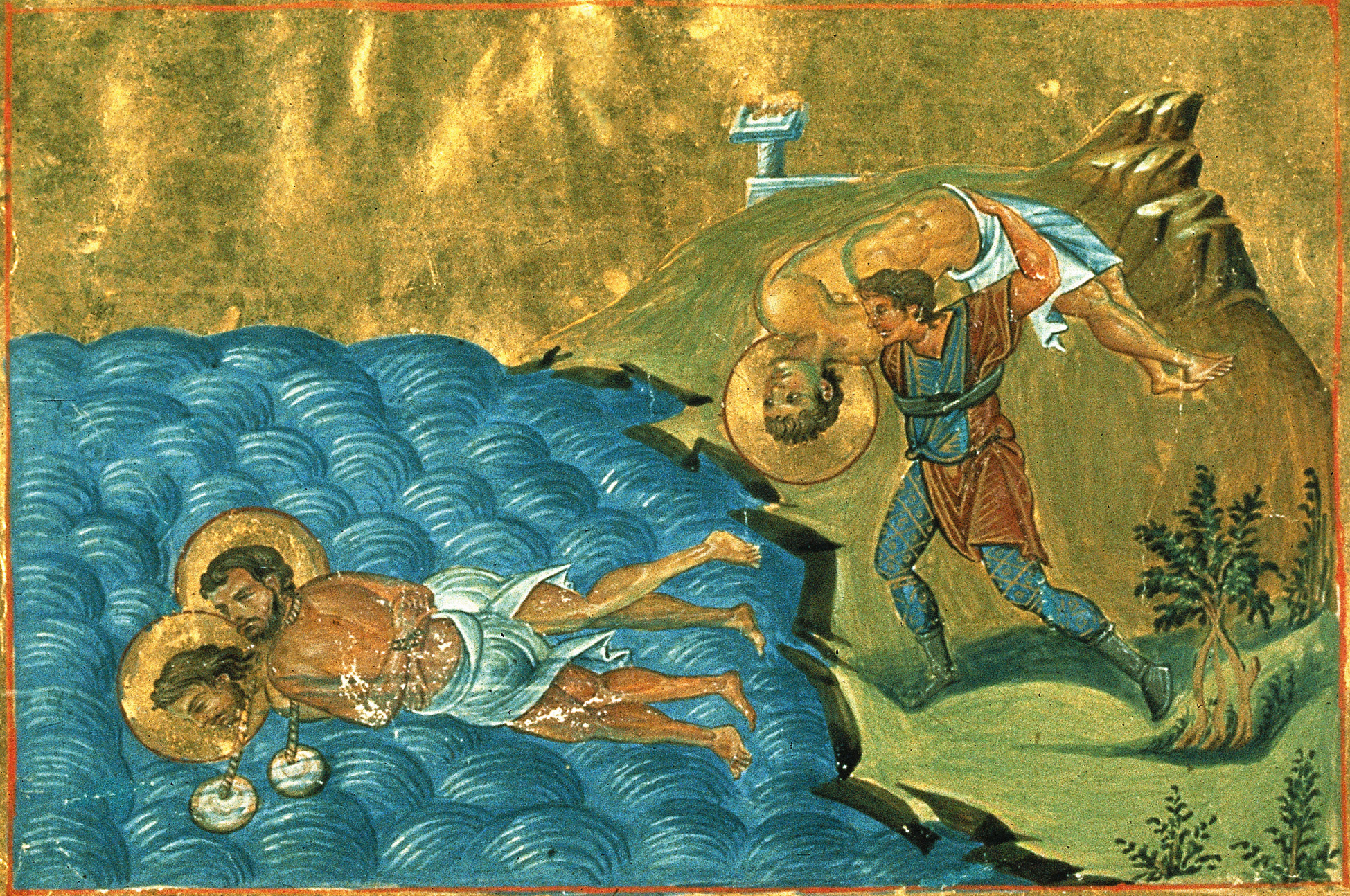
Martyrs Dasius, Gaius, and Zoticus, at Nicomedia.
(Menologion of Basil II, 10th century).

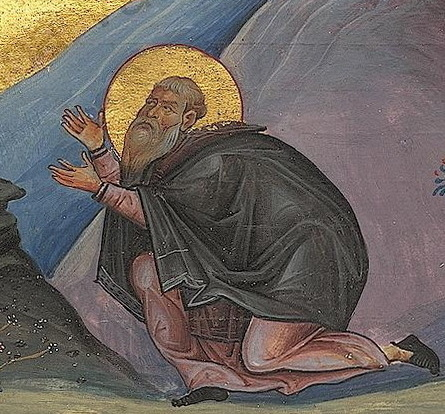
Venerable Hilarion the Great.
(Menologion of Basil II, 10th century).

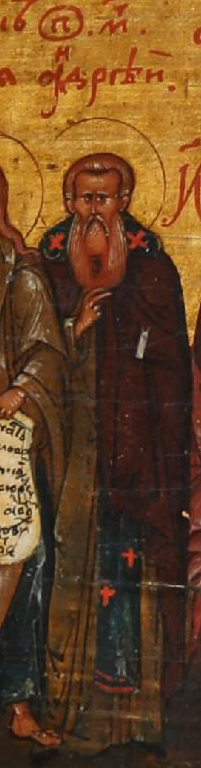
St. Andrew of Crete.

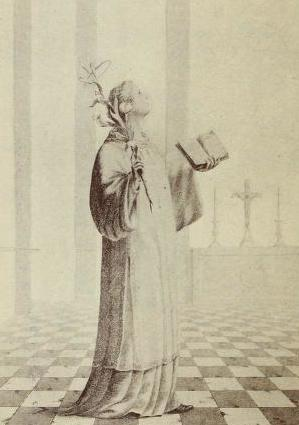
St. Viator of Lyons.

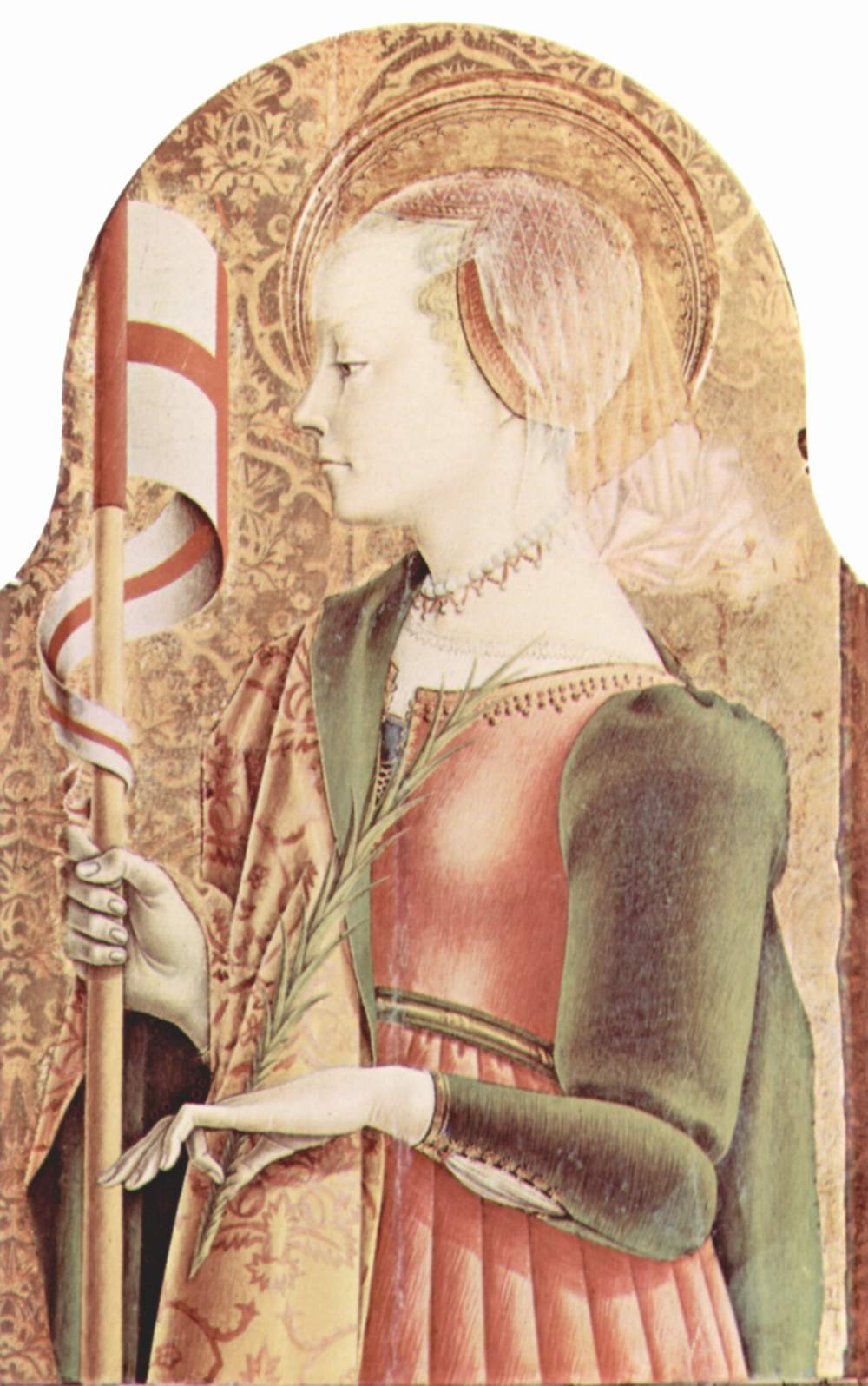
St. Ursula of Cologne.

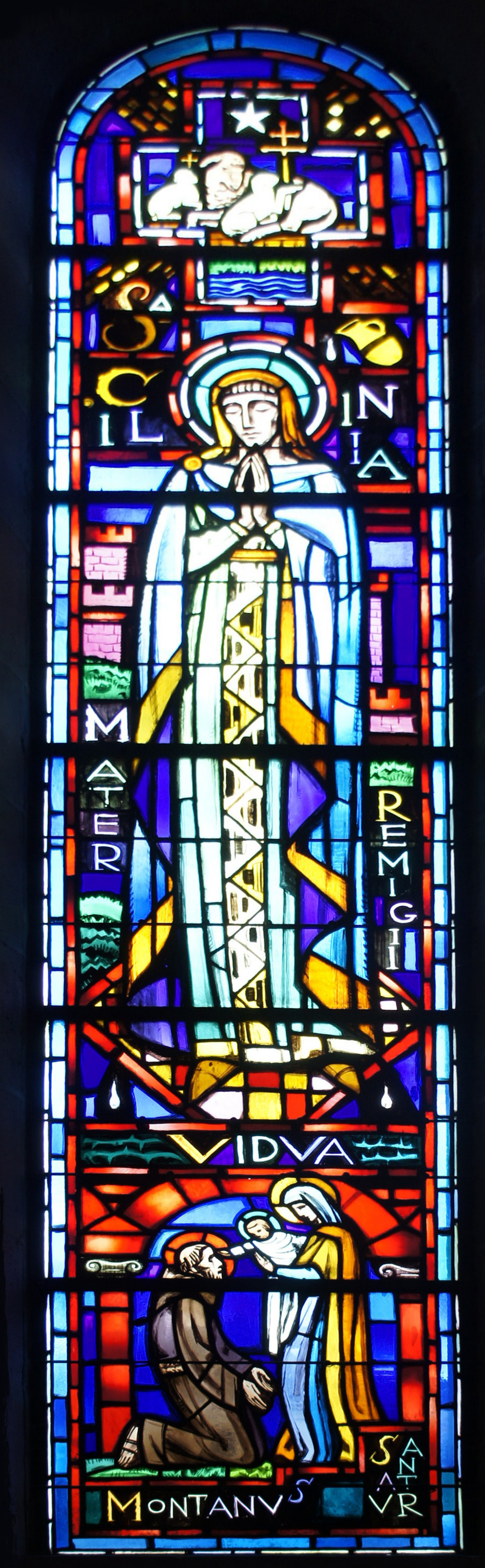
Saint Cilinia of Laon.

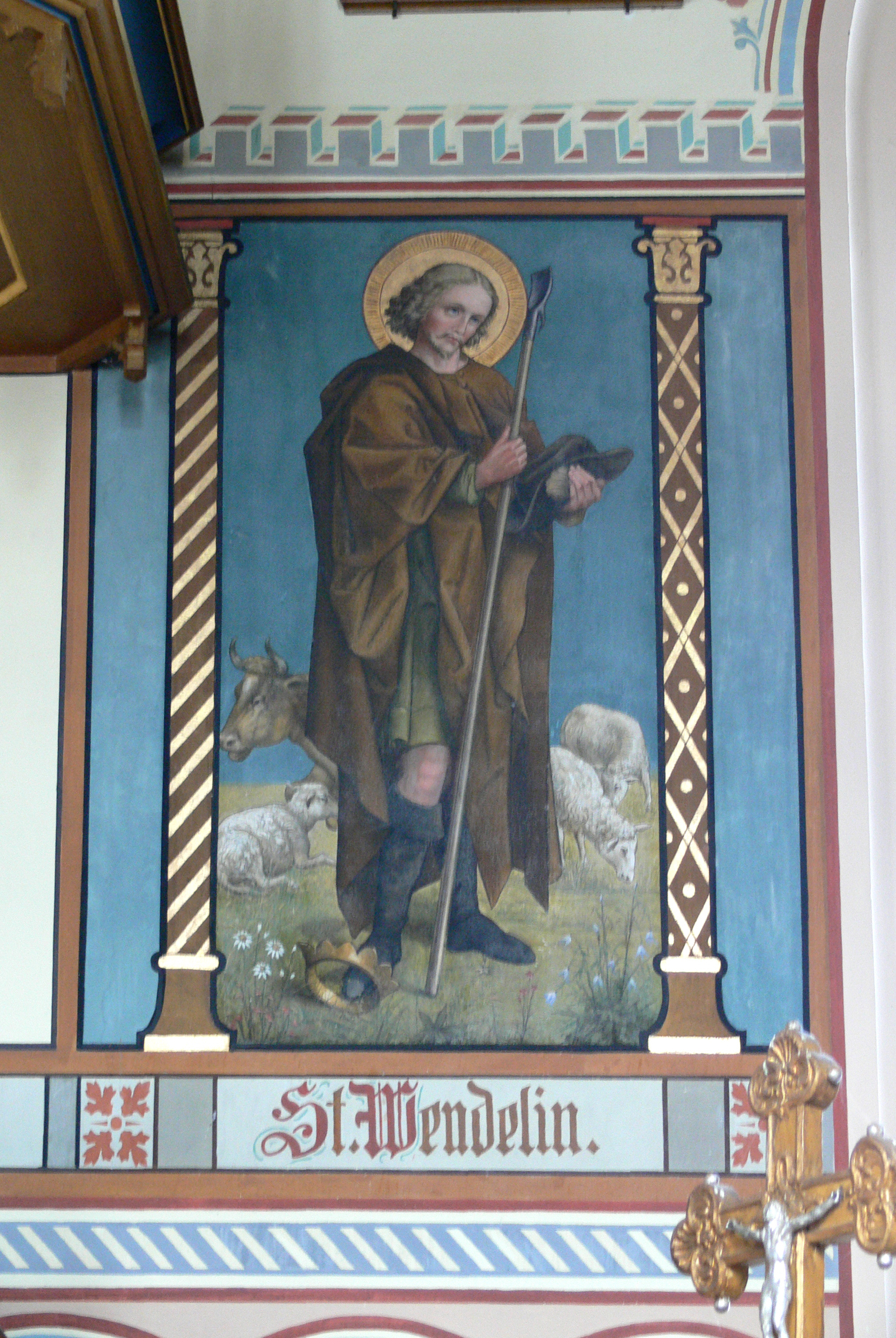
St. Wendelin of Trier.

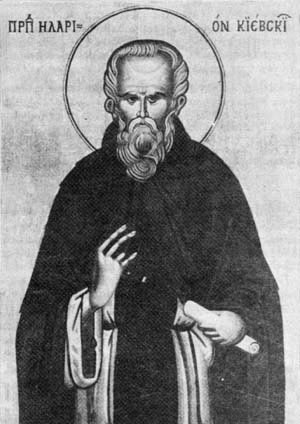
Saint Hilarion of Kiev, Metropolitan of Kiev.

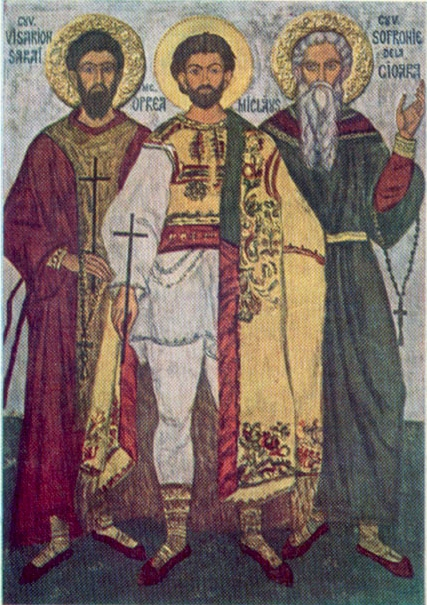
Sts. Bessarion (Sarai) and Sophronius of Ciorara, Confessors, and St. Oprea of Săliște.

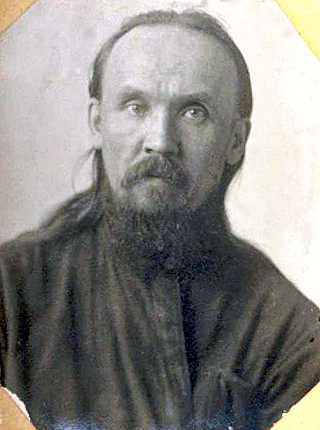
New Hieromartyr Alexis (Bui), Bishop of Voronezh.

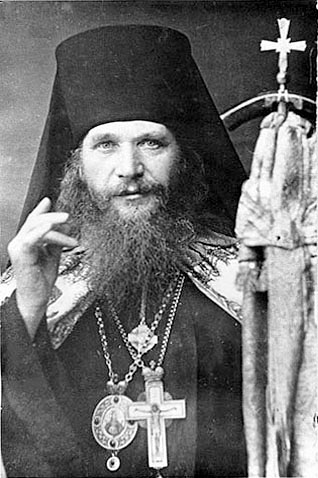
New Hieromartyr Paulinus (Kroshechkin), Archbishop of Mogilev.

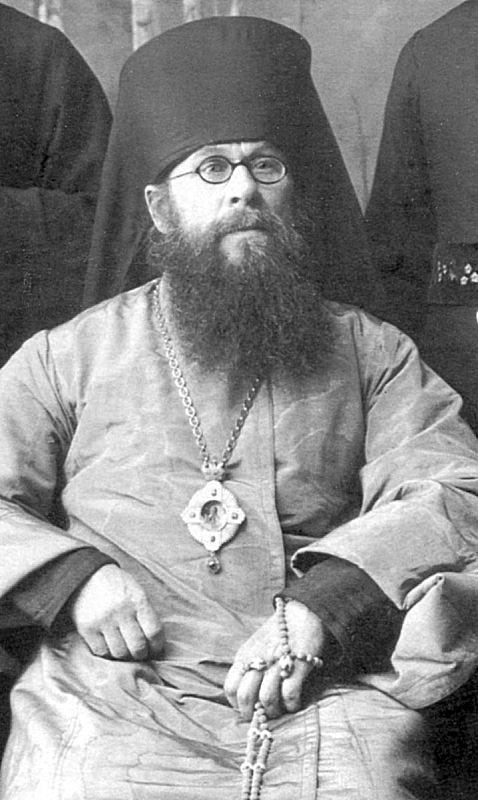
New Hieromartyr Arcadius (Yershov), Bishop of Ekaterinburg.

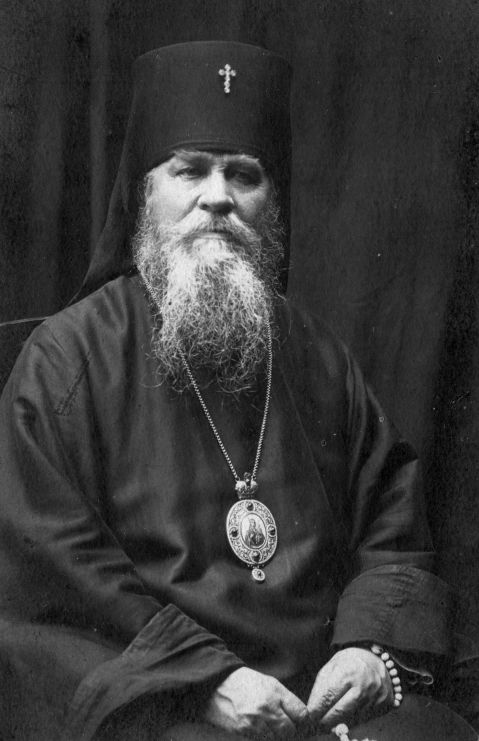
New Hieromartyr Damian (Voskresensky), Archbishop of Kursk.

New Hieromartyr Neophytus (Osipov), Archimandrite.

== Sources ==
- October 21 / November 3. Orthodox Calendar (PRAVOSLAVIE.RU).
- November 3 / October 21. HOLY TRINITY RUSSIAN ORTHODOX CHURCH (A parish of the Patriarchate of Moscow).
- October 21. OCA - The Lives of the Saints.
- The Autonomous Orthodox Metropolia of Western Europe and the Americas (ROCOR). St. Hilarion Calendar of Saints for the year of our Lord 2004. St. Hilarion Press (Austin, TX). p. 78.
- The Twenty-First Day of the Month of October. Orthodoxy in China.
- October 21. Latin Saints of the Orthodox Patriarchate of Rome.
- The Roman Martyrology. Transl. by the Archbishop of Baltimore. Last Edition, According to the Copy Printed at Rome in 1914. Revised Edition, with the Imprimatur of His Eminence Cardinal Gibbons. Baltimore: John Murphy Company, 1916. p. 325.
- Rev. Richard Stanton. A Menology of England and Wales, or, Brief Memorials of the Ancient British and English Saints Arranged According to the Calendar, Together with the Martyrs of the 16th and 17th Centuries. London: Burns & Oates, 1892. pp. 508–510.

Greek Sources

- Great Synaxaristes: (in Greek) 21 ΟΚΤΩΒΡΙΟΥ. ΜΕΓΑΣ ΣΥΝΑΞΑΡΙΣΤΗΣ.
- (in Greek) Συναξαριστής. 21 Οκτωβρίου. ECCLESIA.GR. (H ΕΚΚΛΗΣΙΑ ΤΗΣ ΕΛΛΑΔΟΣ).
- (in Greek) 21/10/2017. Ορθόδοξος Συναξαριστής.

Russian Sources

- (in Russian) 3 ноября (21 октября). Православная Энциклопедия под редакцией Патриарха Московского и всея Руси Кирилла (электронная версия). (Orthodox Encyclopedia - Pravenc.ru).
- (in Russian) 21 октября по старому стилю / 3 ноября по новому стилю. Русская Православная Церковь - Православный церковный календарь на 2016 год.
