= Lycus (river of Constantinople) =

Stream that is now vaulted over that flowed in Constantinople

Map of Byzantine Constantinople. The Lycus runs through the city from northwest to south

The Lycus (Greek: Λύκος, romanized: Lykos, lit. "wolf"; Turkish: Bayrampaşa Deresi) is a stream, now vaulted over, that flowed in Constantinople (today's Istanbul), which was important for historical reasons. The only waterway present within the walled city, it was covered in the 1950s to build the Vatan Caddesi (now Adnan Menderes Vatan Caddesi) avenue. The creek valley played a crucial role in the Fall of Constantinople in 1453.

== Course ==
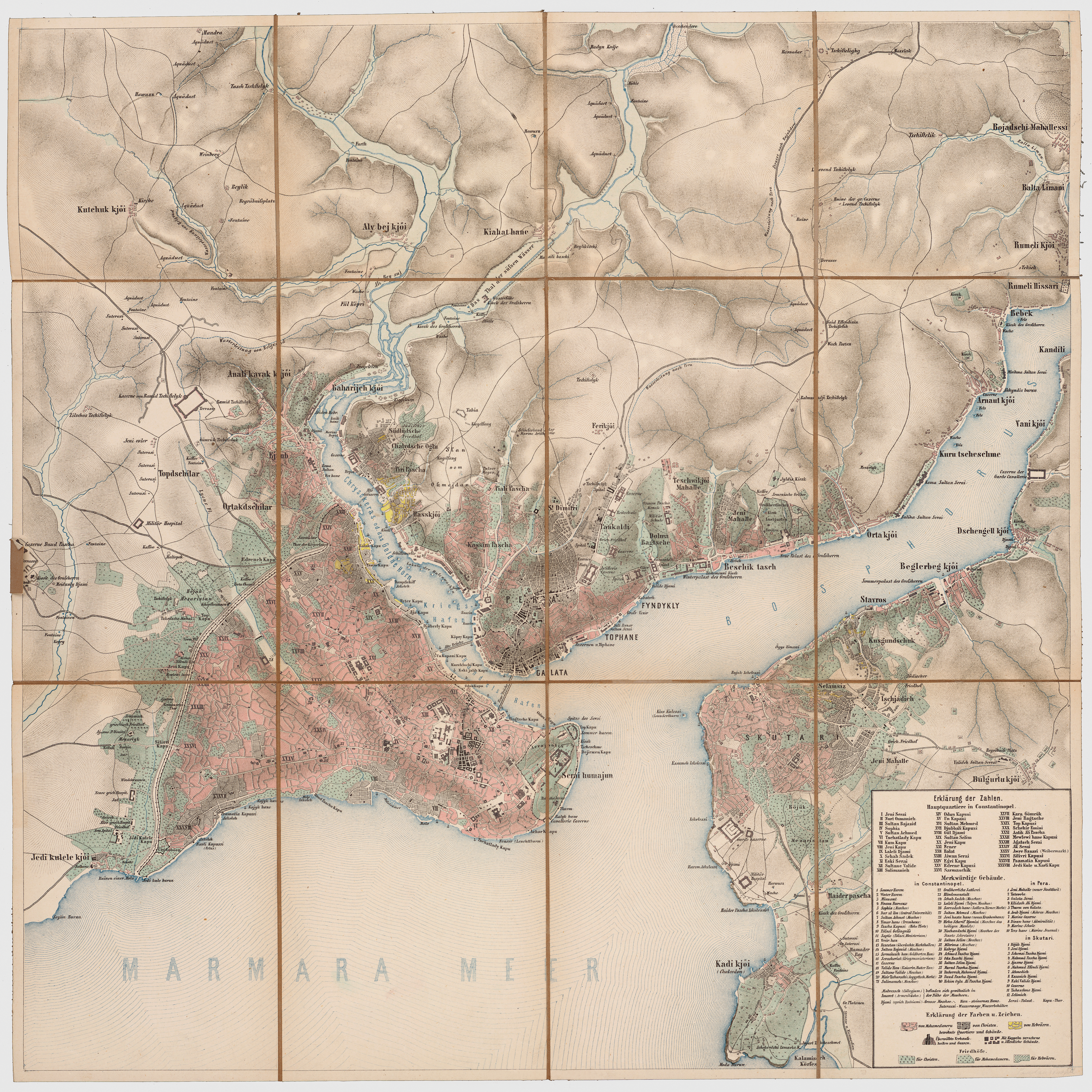
Constantinople map from 1860 to 1870 with the Lycus Valley in evidence within the historical peninsula

The Lycus, which was six kilometers long, was the only drainage channel for the walled city. The maximum width of the valley it formed was 3.5 km and occupied one-third of the area of Byzantine Constantinople.

Its springs are located in the heights of the Topçular neighborhood, in the northern part of the present-day Bayrampaşa district, about 3.5 km northwest of the Edirne (Adrianople) Gate (Turkish: Edirne Kapişi) of the Theodosian walls. Geographically, the creek separated the seventh hill of the city (located to the west) from the third, fourth, fifth, and sixth. Administratively, it marked the boundary between the twelfth regio (located to the west) and the rest of the city.

The Lycus reached the walls of Constantinople between the gates of Carisius and St. Romanus (corresponding to modern Edirnekapı and Topkapı), just south of the Fifth Military Gate, passed under the walls and entered the city. At that point a tower, now known as "Sulukule," meaning "water tower", protected the river. The creek continued its course inside the walls, in a valley made fertile by the watercourse, named for that reasonYenibahce ("new garden" in Turkish) by Turks. It headed southeast, passing south of Lips Monastery and reached the Forum Bovis. There it turned abruptly southward, touching the heights of Avretpazar, running just before its mouth through a plain called Aksaray ("white palace" in Turkish), perhaps after a building inhabited by Empress Irene in the early ninth century. The watercourse finally flowed into the Sea of Marmara at the Harbour of Theodosius, also called the Harbour of Eleutherios.

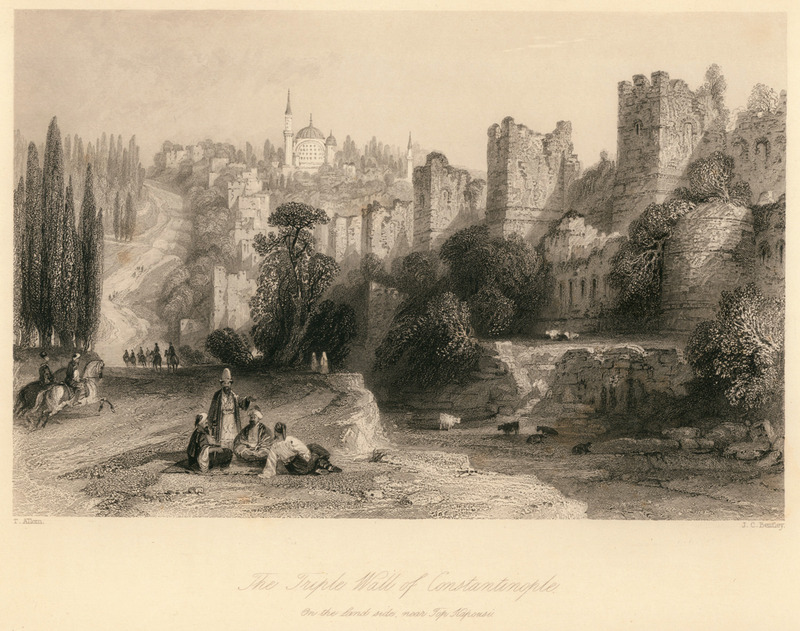
The Lycus valley near the walls with the Mihrimah Sultan Mosque in the background in an 1836 engraving

Although the water regime of the watercourse was stream-like, and thus with little water for most of the year, the heavy rains that fell especially in February brought a lot of dirt into the stream, which flowed into the west and northwest parts of the harbor. To prevent the silting up of the southeastern part, a wall was therefore built that divided the harbor into two parts and acted as a barrier. Although the sheltered part of the harbor held out longer than the rest of the basin, it too was eventually filled in by sediment. Due to that, from the 12th to 13th centuries the siltation caused by the creek gradually caused the harbor to disappear, creating in its place the area called Vlanga or Langabostanı, which was used for vegetable cultivation until relatively recent times.

== History ==
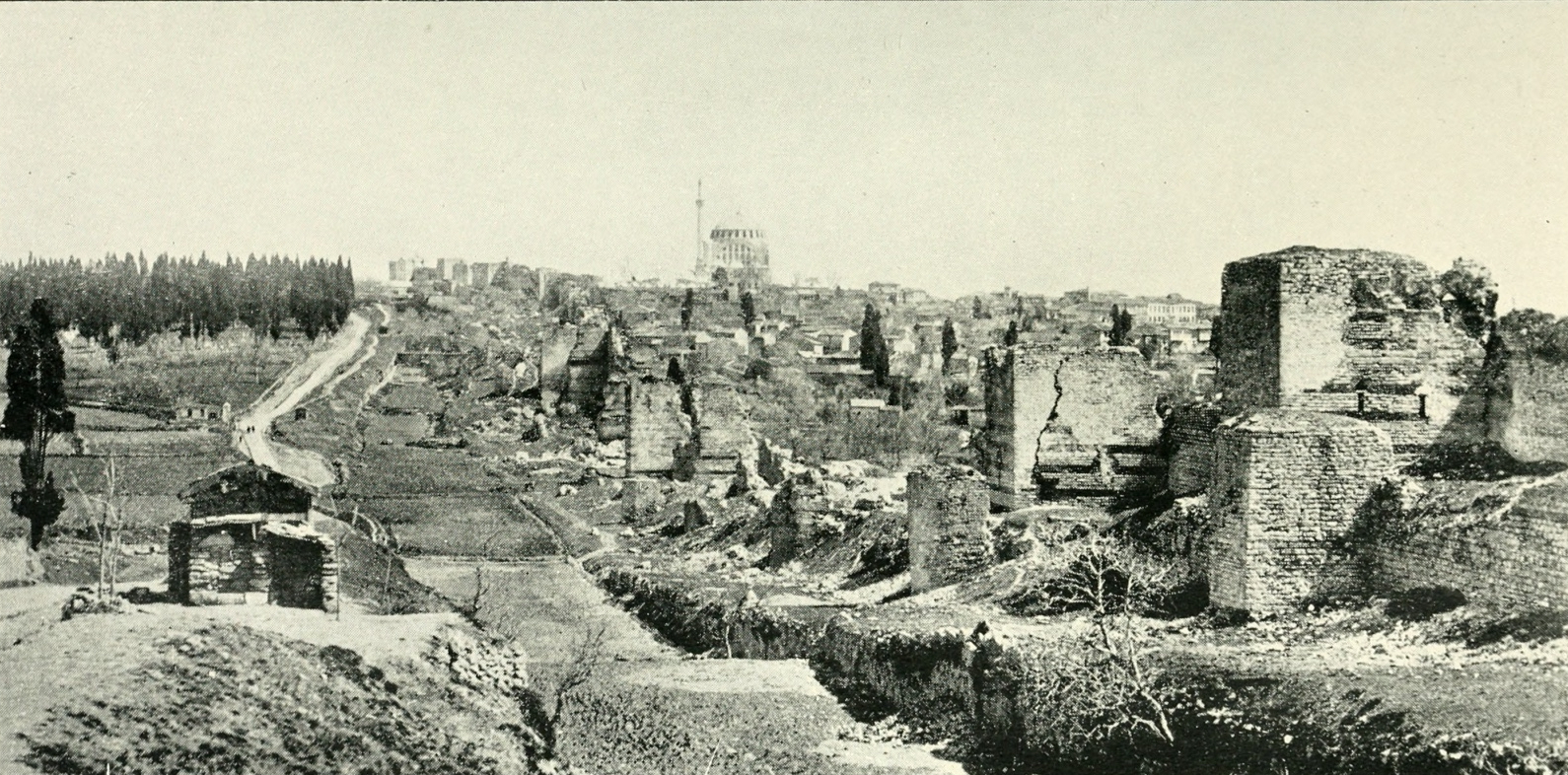
The Lycus valley at the Theodosian walls looking north at the end of 19th century

The area of its estuary, originally a marsh and later then due to sea level rise a body of water, hosted a Neolithic settlement, and eventually the area became the Byzantine harbour of Theodosius.

The Lycus valley was never much inhabited in the Byzantine period, but it was a favored place for the settlement of Greek Orthodox monasteries: famous were those of Dios and Ikasia (or Cassia), Cocorobion and Lips. In 450, while hunting in the valley near Constantinople, Emperor Theodosius II (r. 402–450) fell from his horse and died. Ancient Ottoman maps of the city show that the lower course of the creek, south of the Lips monastery, had become a subterranean waterway. There are hints that these works were done during the Byzantine period.

The section of the city walls which crossed the valley in the north of the city, named Mesoteichion in Greek, was lower than the surrounding heights, and because of that was the weakest of the entire defensive circle. The Ottoman sultan Mehmet II was fully aware of this, and in fact the plan of the siege included, after the wearing down of the walls in the Blachernae sector, the final attack in the creek valley. In anticipation of this, the sultan set up his tent in the high ground to the left of the Lycus. His plan succeeded, and it was from a breach between the Gate of St. Romanus and the Fifth Military Gate, on the right bank of the stream, that the Ottomans penetrated the city on the morning of May 29, 1453.

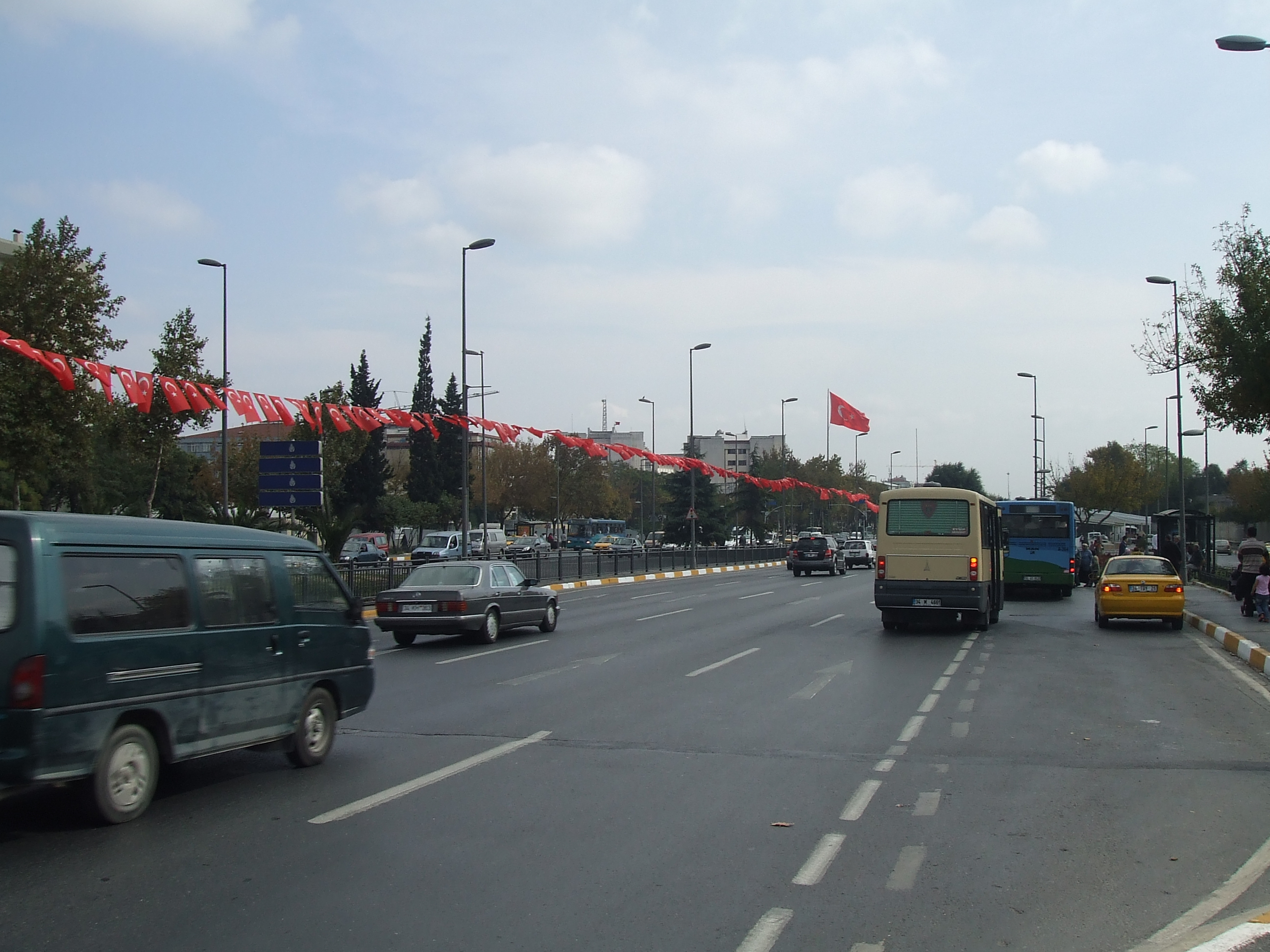
Adnan Menderes Caddesi, the avenue which covers the Lycus bed

The valley remained sparsely inhabited and cultivated with gardens until Istanbul's explosive population increase, but then the area under vegetable gardens began to decline until it disappeared in the late twentieth century. In the period 1956–1957 a new road, the Vatan Caddesi (now Adnan Menderes Vatan Caddesi), was built directly over the riverbed, which was then covered over. The Lycus was briefly uncovered during the construction of the M1 subway line, which connects the city center to the Atatürk Airport.

== Sources ==
- van Millingen, Alexander (1899). Byzantine Constantinople: The Walls of the City and Adjoining Historical Sites. London, United Kingdom: John Murray.
- Janin, Raymond (1950). Constantinople Byzantine (in French). Paris: Institut Français d'Etudes Byzantines.
- Müller-Wiener, Wolfgang (1977). Bildlexikon zur Topographie Istanbuls: Byzantion, Konstantinupolis, Istanbul bis zum Beginn d. 17 Jh (in German). Tübingen: Wasmuth. ISBN 978-3-8030-1022-3.
- Freely, John (1991). Blue Guide Istanbul (3 ed.). W. W. Norton & Company. ISBN 0-393-30728-X.
- Mango, Cyril (2001). "The shoreline of Constantinople in the fourth century". In Nevra Necipoğlu (ed.). Byzantine Constantinople: Monuments, Topography and Everyday Life. Leiden: Brill. ISBN 90-04-11625-7.
- Decker, Michael; Nicholson, Oliver (2018). "Roman and post-Roman hunting and hawking". The Oxford Dictionary of Late Antiquity. Oxford: Oxford University Press. ISBN 9780198662778.
