= October 17 (Eastern Orthodox liturgics) =

Day in the Eastern Orthodox liturgical calendar

Eastern Orthodox liturgical calendar
October 16	October 17	October 18
October 17 O.S. ≍ October 30 N.S. October 17 N.S ≍ October 4 O.S.

An Eastern Orthodox cross

October 17 in Eastern Orthodox liturgical calendars is a feast day and a day of commemoration of saints and martyrs. Although some Orthodox churches use the Revised Julian Calendar and others use the traditional Julian calendar, the fixed commemorations for their respective October 17 are broadly the same, no matter which calendar is used. (Note: Despite the dates being the same, the days to which they refer typically differ by 13 days. The notation Old Style or O.S. is sometimes used to indicate a date in the traditional Julian Calendar (the "Old Calendar"). The notation New Style or N.S. indicates a date in the Revised Julian calendar (the "New Calendar").)

== Saints ==
- Prophet Hosea (Osee) (820 BC) (see also: December 4, July 4)
- Holy Martyrs and Unmercenary Physicians Cosmas and Damian, and their brothers, martyrs Leontius, Anthimus, and Eutropius, and 15 Holy Unmercenaries with them, in Cilicia (4th century)
- Saints Antigonus, Loukianos, Terentius, Nicomedes and Theophanis. (Note: They are absent from the Synaxaria and the Menaia. They are found commemorated only in Parisian Codex 1578, without biographical details.)
- Saints Isidora and Neophyte. (Note: They are absent from the Synaxaria. They are commemorated in the Morsellian Synaxarion.)
- Martyr Queen Shushanik (Susanna) of Georgia (475) (see also: August 28)
- Hieromartyr Andrew of Crete, in "the Judgment" (767) (Note: "At Constantinople, during the reign of Constantine Copronymus, St. Andrew of Crete, a monk, who was often scourged for the worship of holy images, and finally, after having one of his feet cut off, breathed his last.") (see also: October 21)

== Pre-Schism Western saints ==
- Saint Ignatius of Antioch, called 'the God-bearer', Bishop of Antioch (107) (Note: Bishop of Antioch for forty years, he was taken to Rome by order of Trajan and was thrown to the wild beasts in the amphitheatre. On his way to Rome he wrote seven letters which survive. His relics are in St Peter's in Rome.) (see also: December 20 - East)
- Saint Solina, born in Gascony in France, she escaped to Chartres to avoid marriage to a pagan, was beheaded in Chartres (c. 290) (Note: "This saint is said to have been a Christian maiden of Aquitain, who fled from home, as her parents were heathens, but was taken and martyred at Chartres.")
- Saint Regulus (Rule), by tradition an abbot who brought relics of St Andrew from Greece to Scotland, leading to St Andrew's adoption as the patron-saint of Scotland (4th century)
- Saint Florentius of Orange, the eighth Bishop of Orange in the south of France (c. 526)
- Saint Victor of Capua, consecrated Bishop of Capua in Italy in 541 and a prolific writer (554)
- Saint Colmán of Kilroot, a disciple of St Ailbe of Emly and Bishop of Kilroot near Carrickfergus in Ireland (6th century)
- Saint Louthiern, born in Ireland, he is the patron-saint of St Ludgran in Cornwall (6th century) (Note: [The Bollandists on this day, when commemorated in Brittany. In the Irish Martyrologies S. Luchtighern of Inistymon on April 28.]: "In the ancient British litanies of the 7th cent. S. Louthiern is invoked. He is probably the same as S. Luchtighern, abbot of Inistymon, who often visited S. Itta. Very little is known of him, except that he was a disciple of S. Ruadan of Lothra. He probably came to Cornwall, where he has left his name as patron of a parish, S. Ludgran; the church probably occupies the site of his oratory. There he died; but his relics were carried into Brittany, in the 6th century, and thence to Paris in 965. An account of the translation of the relics is preserved in Mabillon. His shrine is called there "la Chasse de S. Louthierne."")
- Martyrs Æthelred and Æthelberht, Princes of Kent (c. 640) (Note: Great-grandsons of St Ethelbert of Kent, cruelly put to death at Eastry near Sandwich in England.) (Note: "The brothers ST. ETHELRED and ST. ETHELBERT were the sons of Ermenred, the eldest son of Eadbald, King of Kent, and grandson of St. Ethelbert. The throne was occupied in succession by their uncle Erconbert and their cousin Egbert, to whose protection their father, dying when they were of tender age, entrusted them. They were much beloved by King Egbert for their blameless lives and many good qualities, but incurred the jealous hatred of Thunor, his chief counsellor... ...He accordingly murdered the good brothers, and secretly buried them in the hall of the royal residence at Eastry, and actually beneath the King's seat. At night a bright light was seen to shine over the palace, which the King himself, going out before dawn, was witness of. He sent for Thunor and obliged him to own his crime... ...It is related that Thunor began to remonstrate with Egbert on the quantity of his best land which he was alienating, when the earth opened and swallowed him up, at a place still called Thunorsleap, or Thunorslow. Meanwhile, it was resolved to bury the Martyrs at Christ Church, Canterbury, but it was found impossible to raise the bodies. The same thing happened when St. Augustine's was proposed. At length the Monastery of Wakering, in Essex, was suggested, and then the transport was effected without the least difficulty, and attended with various miracles. In later times the sacred remains of these holy Martyrs were translated to the celebrated Abbey of Ramsey, that they might receive greater honour from the concourse of the faithful.")
- Saint Berarius, Bishop of Le Mans in France (c. 680)
- Saint Anstrudis of Laon (688) (Note: Daughter of Sts Blandinus and Salaberga, the founders of the convent of St John the Baptist in Laon. Mother and daughter were successively the first two abbesses. She had much to suffer at the hands of Ebroin, the oppressor of all the saints of that age.)
- Saint Nothhelm, eleventh Archbishop of Canterbury and a friend of St Bede and St Boniface (739) (Note: "NOTHELM was a priest of the Church of London, when chosen to succeed Tatwine as Archbishop of Canterbury. He afforded great assistance to St. Bede in the compilation of his ecclesiastical history, by collecting important traditions relating to St Augustine and his companions, and afterwards, when in Rome, by copying from the Archives of the Holy See various apostolic letters and other documents relating to England, with the sanction of Pope St. Gregory III. He also corresponded with St Boniface in Germany. Nothelm governed his See till the year 740, when he was called to his rest, and succeeded by Cuthbert.")

== Post-Schism Orthodox saints ==
- Martyr Kozman (Kosmas), of Georgia. (Note: He is absent in the Synaxaria. He is commemorated in the Jerusalemitic Canonarion.)
- Venerable Anthony, founder of Leokhnov Monastery, Novgorod (1611) (Note: See: (in Russian) Антоний Леохновский. Википе́дия. (Russian Wikipedia).)
- Saint Ioseb (Jandierishvili) the Wonderworker, Catholicos of Georgia (1770) (Note: See: (in Georgian) იოსები (ჯანდიერიშვილი). ვიკიპედიაში. (Georgian Wikipedia).)

=== New Martys and Confessors ===
- New Hieromartyrs Neophyt Lyubimov (Note: See: (in Russian) Любимов, Неофит Порфирьевич. Википедии. (Russian Wikipedia).) and Anatoly Ivanovsky, (Note: See: (in Russian) Ивановский, Анатолий Дмитриевич. Википедии. (Russian Wikipedia).) Priests (1918)
- New Monk-martyrs Jacinthus Pitatelev and Callistus Oparin, of the St. Nicholas Monastery, Verkhoturye (1918)
- New Hieromartyr Alexander (Shchukin), Archbishop of Semipalatinsk (1937) (Note: See: (in Russian) Александр (Щукин). Википе́дия. (Russian Wikipedia).)

== Other commemorations ==
- Translation of the relics (695) of St. Etheldreda, Royal Abbess of Ely (679) (Note: "ST. ETHELDREDA was succeeded in the government of the Abbey of Ely by her sister St. Sexburga, widow of Erconbert, King of Kent. Her affection and veneration for the holy foundress inspired her with the desire of removing her sacred relics to an honourable place within the church. It was sixteen years after the death of Etheldreda, when the pious design was carried out... ...The sacred body, when raised from the ground, was placed under a tent prepared for the purpose, and thither St. Sexburga, with a few attendants, retired to wash and arrange the venerated bones of the Saint. The community, who waited outside, were soon astonished to hear the Abbess cry out with a loud voice, "Praise be to the name of the Lord," and were overcome with holy joy when they were admitted within the tent, and saw the Virgin Saint laid on a bed as if asleep, and without the least sign of corruption, even the linen in which she was wrapped being undecayed. One witness of this prodigy was Cynifrid, the surgeon, who a few days before her death had made a deep incision in the abscess from which she suffered, and could attest that she was buried with a gaping wound in the neck, which was now perfectly healed, and marked only by a slight scar. The sacred body was honourably attired, and translated with holy triumph into the Abbey Church. By the touch of the linen in which it had been wrapped evil spirits were cast out and other cures wrought. The wood of the coffin in which the Saint was first placed was also the means of recovery to many who were suffering from cruel pains in the eyes. This first translation took place on the 17th October, and on the same day, in the year 1106, under the Abbot Richard, her sacred remains were again translated, together with those of her sisters Sexburga and Withburga, as also of St. Ermenilda.") (Note: [Salisbury and Hereford Kalendars, Reformed Anglican Kalendar. Roman Martyrology on June 23; Oct. 17 is the festival of the translation of the relics of S. Etheldreda in 695. The relics were again translated on Sept. 16, 1106. On June 23, also, the York, Sarum and Hereford Kalendars, and Benedictine Mythologies. Authorities: — Bede and the "Hist. Eliensis." The following is taken chiefly from Montalembert's "Monks of the West."]) (see also: June 23 )
- Translation of the relics (898) of St. Lazarus "Of the Four Days" (in the tomb), Bishop of Kition in Cyprus (1st century)
- Icon of the Mother of God "In Giving Birth, you Preserved your Virginity" (1827) (Note: In Greek: ἡ πρὸ τόκου παρθένος, καὶ ἐν τόκῳ παρθένος (Theotokion of the grave mode).)
- Icon of the Mother of God the "Deliveress" / Rescuer (1889) (see also: October 1, October 28 and April 4)
- Synaxis of the Patron Saints of the Holy Metropolis of Hydra, Spetses and Aegina, in Greece.
- Repose of Elder Athanasius (Zakharov) of Ploshchansk Hermitage (1825), disciple of St. Paisius (Velichkovsky).
- Repose of Nun Alypia, Fool-for-Christ, of Goloseyevo, Kiev (1988)

== Icon gallery ==
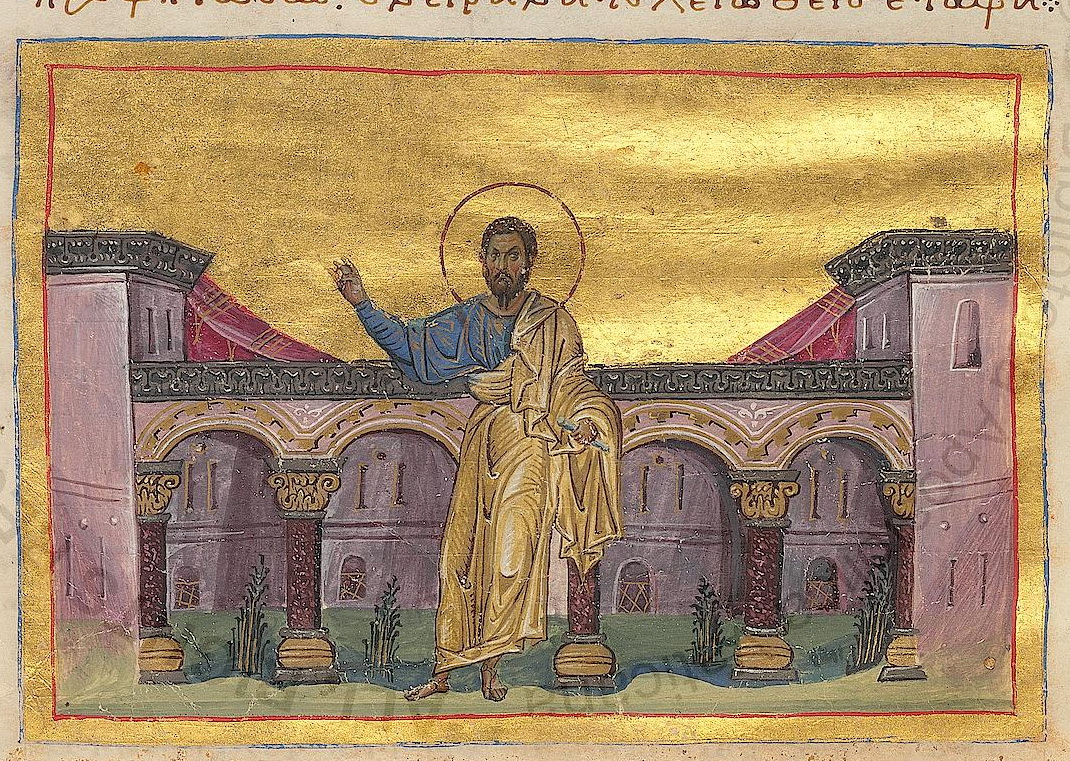
Prophet Hosea (Osee).
(Menologion of Basil II, 10th century).

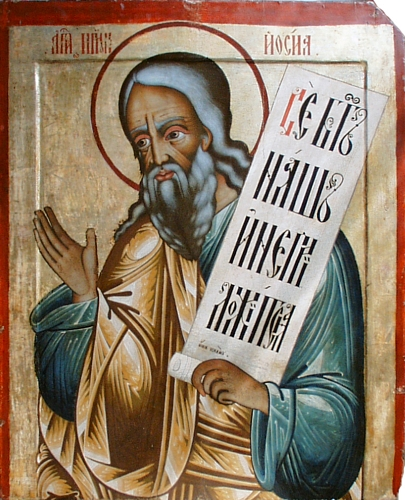
Prophet Hosea (Osee).

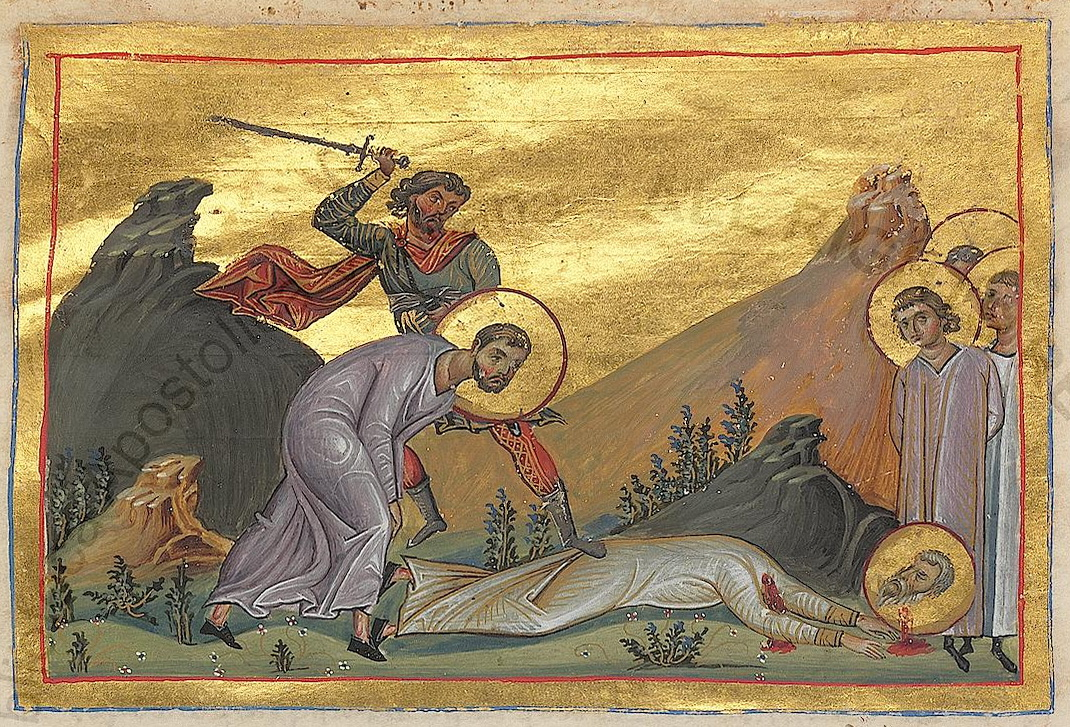
Holy Martyrs and Unmercenary Physicians Cosmas and Damian, and their brothers Leontius, Anthimus, and Eutropius.
(Menologion of Basil II, 10th century).

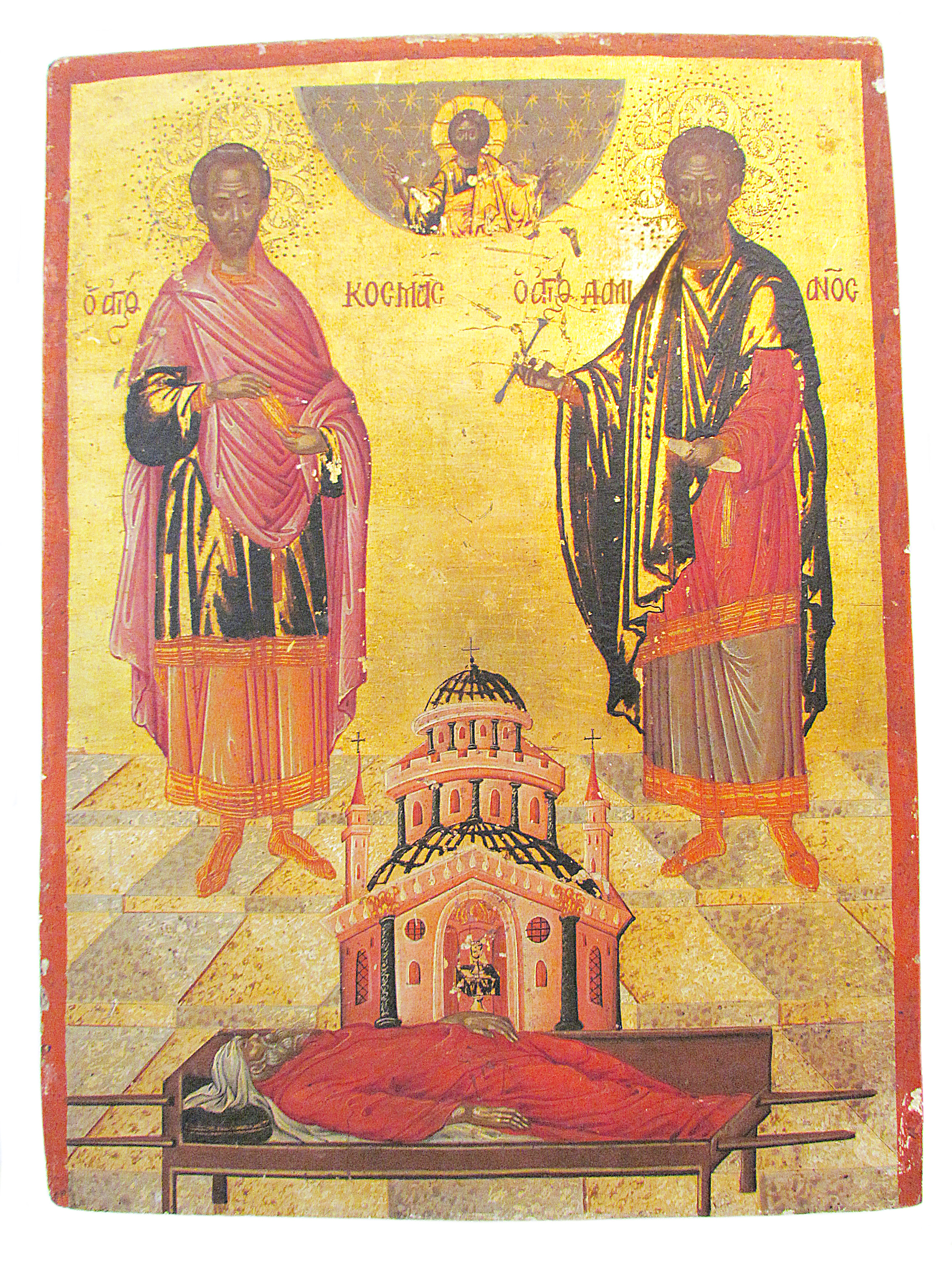
Holy Martyrs and Unmercenary Physicians Cosmas and Damian.

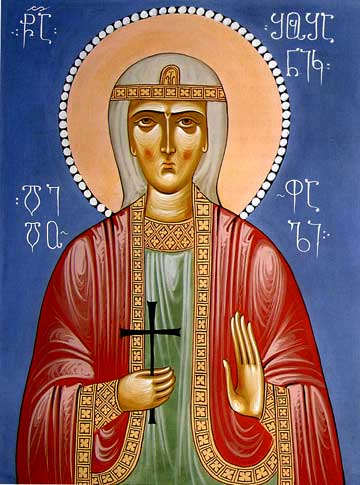
Martyr Queen Shushanik (Susanna) of Georgia.

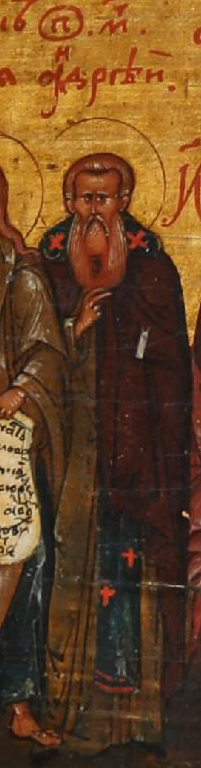
St. Andrew of Crete.

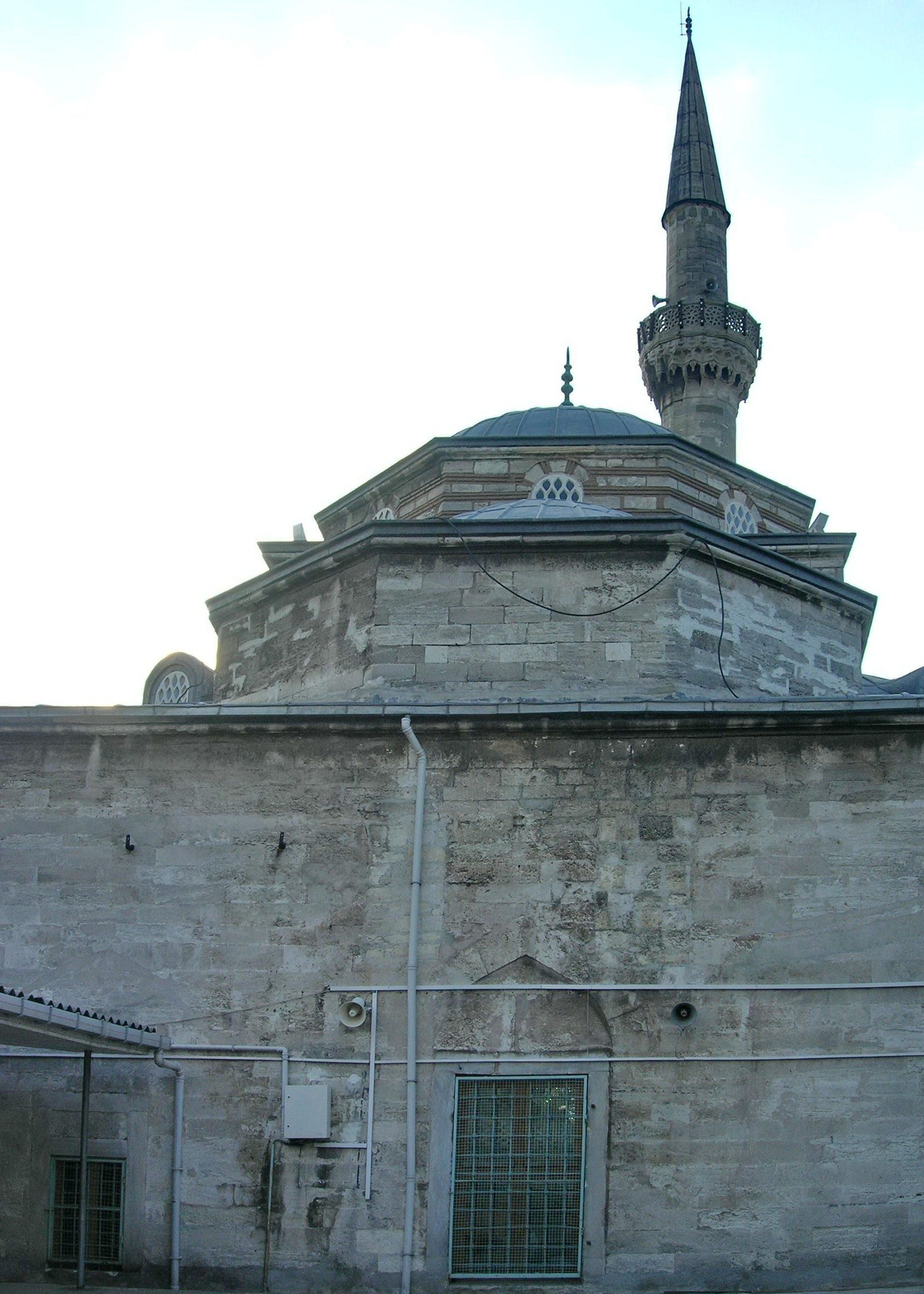
The former Church of the monastery of Hagios Andreas
"en te Krisei"
("in the Judgment").

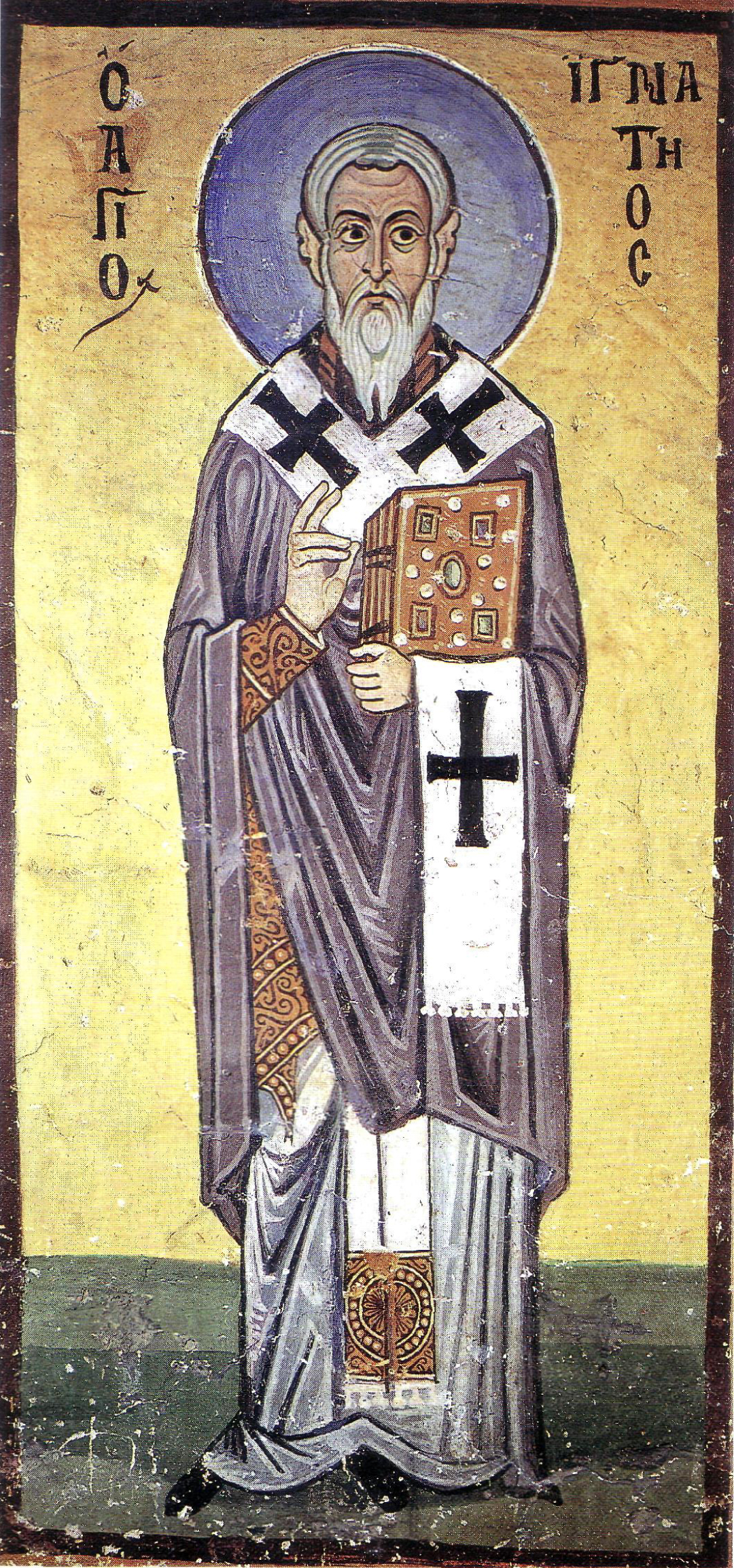
St. Ignatius of Antioch, called 'the God-bearer', Bishop of Antioch.

St. Anthony, founder of Leokhnov Monastery, Novgorod.

New Hieromartyr Neophyt Lyubimov.

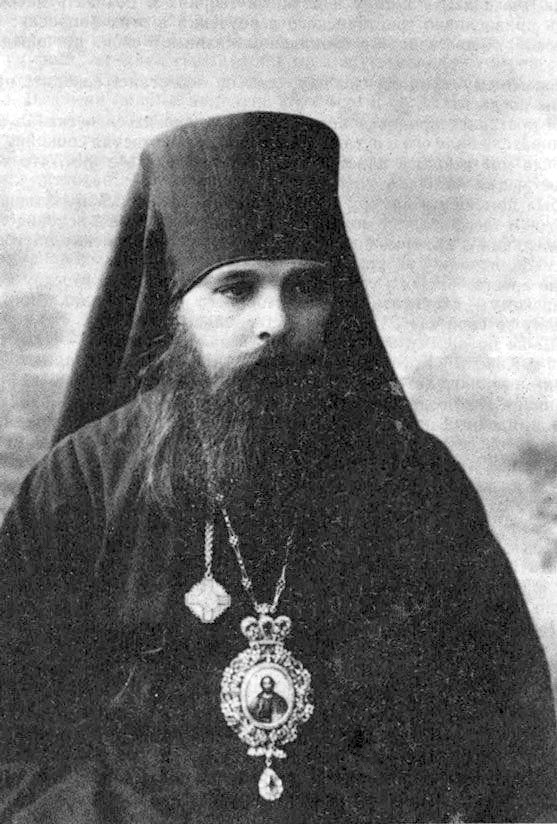
New Hieromartyr Alexander (Shchukin), Archbishop of Semipalatinsk.

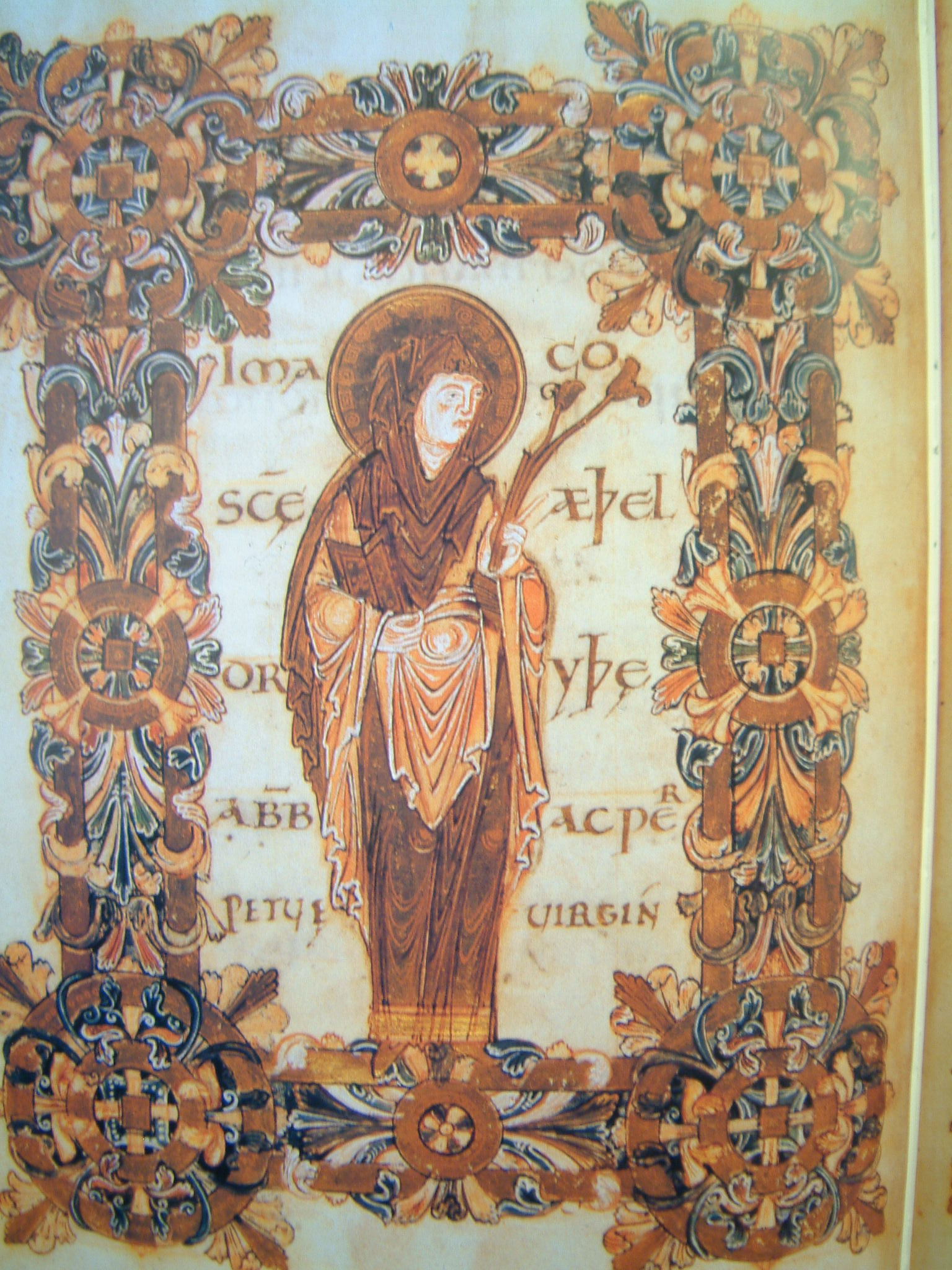
St. Etheldreda, Royal Abbess of Ely.

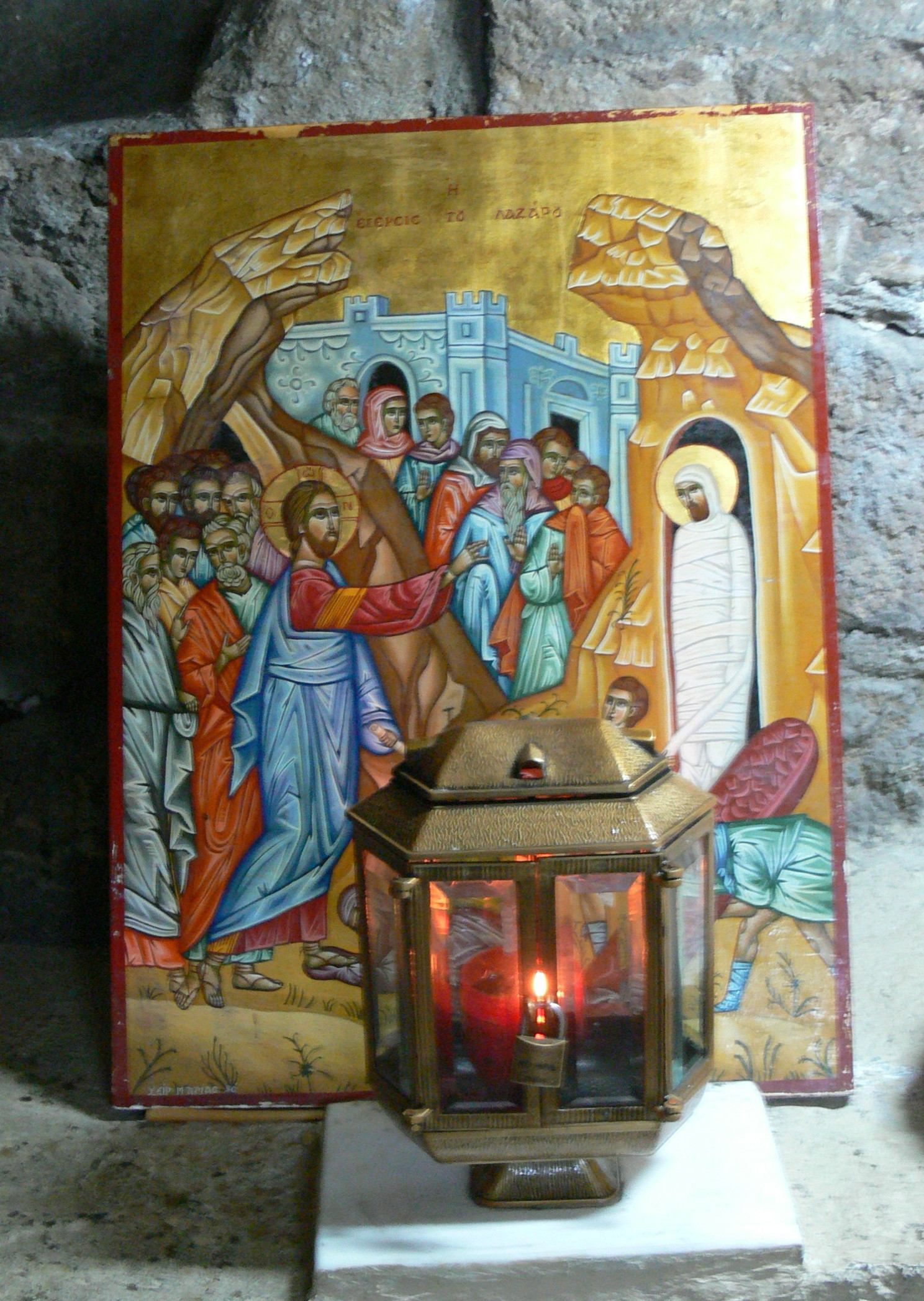
St. Lazarus "Of the Four Days".

== Sources ==
- October 17/30. Orthodox Calendar (PRAVOSLAVIE.RU).
- October 30 / October 17. HOLY TRINITY RUSSIAN ORTHODOX CHURCH (A parish of the Patriarchate of Moscow).
- October 17. OCA - The Lives of the Saints.
- The Autonomous Orthodox Metropolia of Western Europe and the Americas (ROCOR). St. Hilarion Calendar of Saints for the year of our Lord 2004. St. Hilarion Press (Austin, TX). p. 77.
- The Seventeenth Day of the Month of October. Orthodoxy in China.
- October 17. Latin Saints of the Orthodox Patriarchate of Rome.
- The Roman Martyrology. Transl. by the Archbishop of Baltimore. Last Edition, According to the Copy Printed at Rome in 1914. Revised Edition, with the Imprimatur of His Eminence Cardinal Gibbons. Baltimore: John Murphy Company, 1916. pp. 321.
- Rev. Richard Stanton. A Menology of England and Wales, or, Brief Memorials of the Ancient British and English Saints Arranged According to the Calendar, Together with the Martyrs of the 16th and 17th Centuries. London: Burns & Oates, 1892. pp. 498–502.

Greek Sources

- Great Synaxaristes: (in Greek) 17 ΟΚΤΩΒΡΙΟΥ. ΜΕΓΑΣ ΣΥΝΑΞΑΡΙΣΤΗΣ.
- (in Greek) Συναξαριστής. 17 Οκτωβρίου. ECCLESIA.GR. (H ΕΚΚΛΗΣΙΑ ΤΗΣ ΕΛΛΑΔΟΣ).
- (in Greek) 17/10/2017. Ορθόδοξος Συναξαριστής.

Russian Sources

- (in Russian) 30 октября (17 октября). Православная Энциклопедия под редакцией Патриарха Московского и всея Руси Кирилла (электронная версия). (Orthodox Encyclopedia - Pravenc.ru).
- (in Russian) 17 октября по старому стилю / 30 октября по новому стилю. Русская Православная Церковь - Православный церковный календарь на 2016 год.
