= Basil the Copper Hand =

Basil the Copper Hand (Greek: Βασίλειος ὁ Χαλκόχειρ, romanized: Basileios ho Chalkocheir; died c. 932) was a Byzantine rebel leader active in Bithynia in the 920s and early 930s.

== Biography ==
Basil was born in Macedonia (or possibly the theme of Macedonia). In the 920s, in the theme of Opsikion in Bithynia, he assumed the name of the general Constantine Doukas, who had been killed during an attempted coup in 913, and assembled a large following. He was arrested by the local tourmarches, however, and taken to Constantinople, where he was tried by the Eparch and had his hand cut off.

Upon returning to Opsikion, he fashioned for himself a copper hand holding a large sword, gathered poor and destitute people and began a rebellion. With his followers, he seized the stronghold of Plateia Petra and made it his base. The rebels raided the surrounding countryside indiscriminately, and returned with their plunder to Plateia Petra. The revolt was finally subdued by the imperial army, and Basil was brought back to Constantinople. There, he accused several magnates of being involved in the revolt, but an inquiry proved these claims false, and he was burned at the stake in the city's Forum Amastrianum. The revolt, dated to between 928 and c. 932, is often seen as a popular revolt expressing peasant discontent, and a major incentive for Emperor Romanos I Lekapenos's (r. 920–944) agrarian legislation of 934.

== Sources ==
- Kazhdan, Alexander (1951). ""Великое восстание" Василия Медной руки". Византийский Временник (in Russian). 4: 74–83. Archived from the original on 2012-03-05.
- Kazhdan, Alexander (1991). "Basil the Copper Hand". In Kazhdan, Alexander (ed.). The Oxford Dictionary of Byzantium. Oxford and New York: Oxford University Press. pp. 268–269. ISBN 0-19-504652-8.
