= Andrew of Crete (martyr) =

Christian saint and martyr

Saint Andrew of Crete
- Died: c. 767
- Feast: 17 October

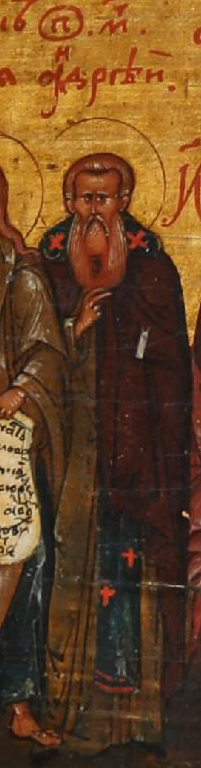

Andrew of Crete was a fervent iconophile, he was executed in the Forum Bovis of Constantinople at the orders of Emperor Constantine V in 766 or 767, during the Byzantine Iconoclasm. Constantine had ordered all Christians to remove any icons from their homes and churches, and anyone who refused was placed in prison; Andrew denounced Constantine in public and was dragged through the streets and executed.

He is regarded as a martyr in the Catholic and Eastern Orthodox churches. His feast day is October 17.

The monastery of St Andrew in Krisei in Constantinople, currently the Koca Mustafa Pasha Mosque in Istanbul, was dedicated to him. It should be noticed that according to modern sources, the figure of Andrew of Crete, like those of many iconophile Saints lived under the iconoclastic period, is unverified.

== Sources ==
- Attwater, Donald and Catherine Rachel John. The Penguin Dictionary of Saints. 3rd edition. New York: Penguin Books, 1993. ISBN 0-14-051312-4.
- Janin, Raymond (1964). Constantinople Byzantine (2 ed.). Paris: Institut français d'etudes byzantines.
- Müller-Wiener, Wolfgang (1977). Bildlexikon Zur Topographie Istanbuls: Byzantion, Konstantinupolis, Istanbul Bis Zum Beginn D. 17 Jh (in German). Tübingen: Wasmuth. ISBN 978-3-8030-1022-3.
- Brubaker, Leslie; Haldon, John (2011). Byzantium in the Iconoclast era (ca 680-850). Cambridge: Cambridge University Press. ISBN 978-0-521-43093-7.
