= Harbour of Eleutherios =

One of the harbours of Constantinople, built by Theodosius on the Sea of Marmara

Coordinates: 41°0′16.8″N 28°57′8″E

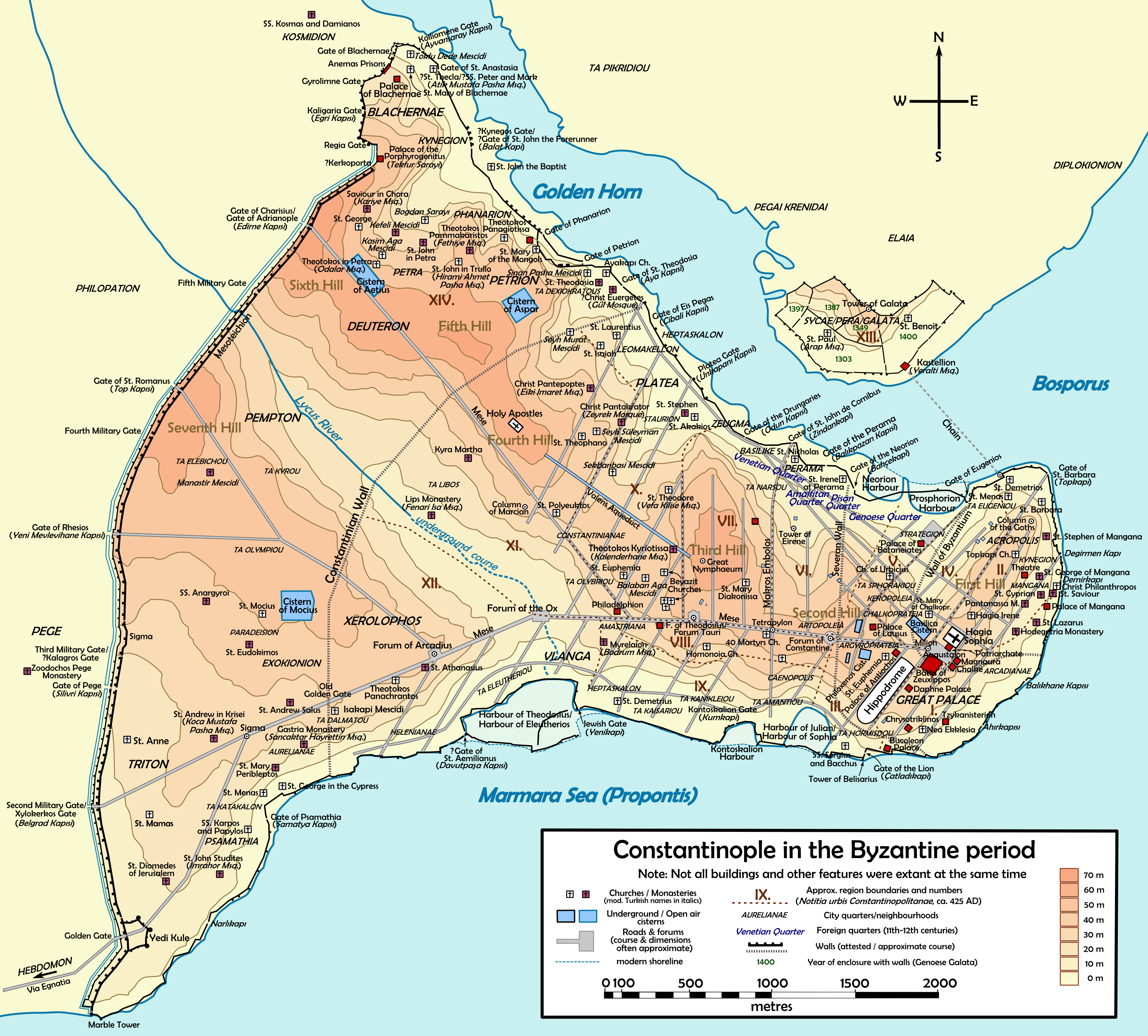
Map of Constantinople during the Byzantine era

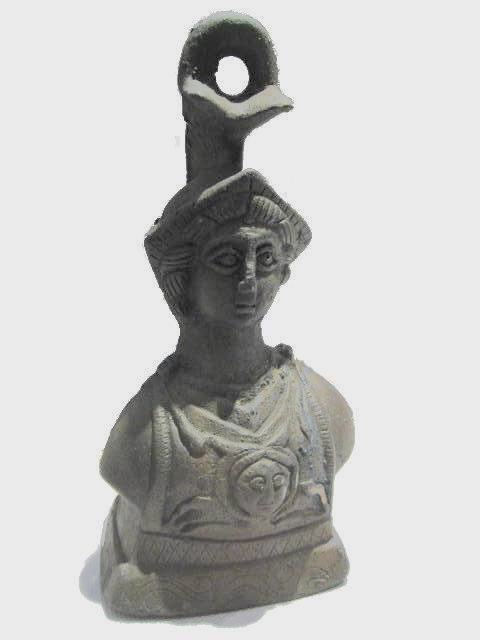
Steelyard weight found in the Port of Theodosius

The Harbour of Theodosius (Latin: Portus Theodosiacus, Ancient Greek: λιμήν Θεοδοσίου) was one of the ports of ancient Constantinople, the capital of the Byzantine Empire, located beneath the modern Yenikapi neighbourhood of Istanbul, Turkey. It was built at the mouth of the Lycus watercourse that ran through the city to the Propontis (the Sea of Marmara). It may have been on or near the Harbour of Eleutherios (Medieval Greek: λιμήν Ἐλευθερίου) which is still unlocated in this area.

The harbour was built in the late 4th century, during the reign of Theodosius I, and was the city's major point of trade in Late Antiquity. It continued to be used until the 11th century. Silt from the Lycus creek eventually filled the harbour entirely and the area was later transformed for agricultural use due to the effects of upstream erosion and deposition. In Ottoman times, the area was built over.

The harbour was located on the south side of the peninsula on which the city is built, on the shore of the Sea of Marmara. The other harbours on the southern coast of the city were the Harbour of Julian and the small harbour of the Boukoleon Palace. The harbours of Neorion (Latin: Neorium) and Prosphorion (Ancient Greek: προσφόριον, lit. 'import harbour', Latin: Portus Prosphorianus) were on the Golden Horn, on the northern shore of the peninsula. Today the northern coast of the harbour is delineated by Kucuk Langa Cad. (Small Langa St.) named after the earlier Greek Vlanga name.

In November 2005, workers on the Bosphorus Tunnel Project discovered the silted-up remains of the harbour. Excavations produced evidence of the 4th-century Portus Theodosiacus. There, archaeologists uncovered traces of the city wall of Constantine the Great, and the remains of over 35 Byzantine ships from the 7th to 10th centuries, including several Byzantine galleys, remains of which had never before been found. In addition, the excavation has uncovered the oldest evidence of settlement in Constantinople, with artefacts, including amphorae, pottery fragments, shells, pieces of bone, horse skulls, and nine human skulls found in a bag, dating back to 6000 BC.

== Gallery ==
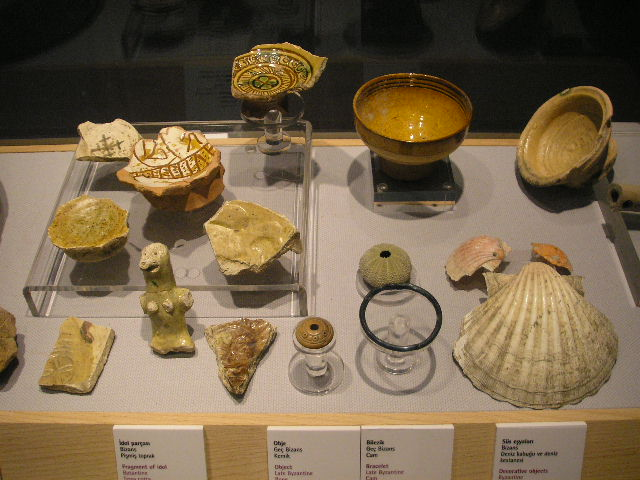
Various findings from the Byzantine era

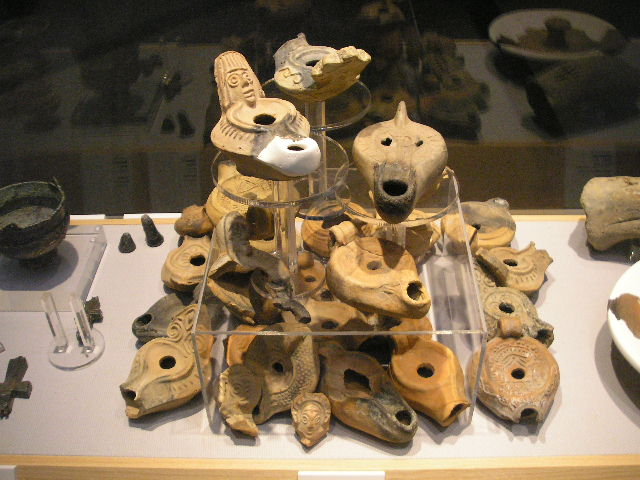
Oil lamps found at Yenikapı

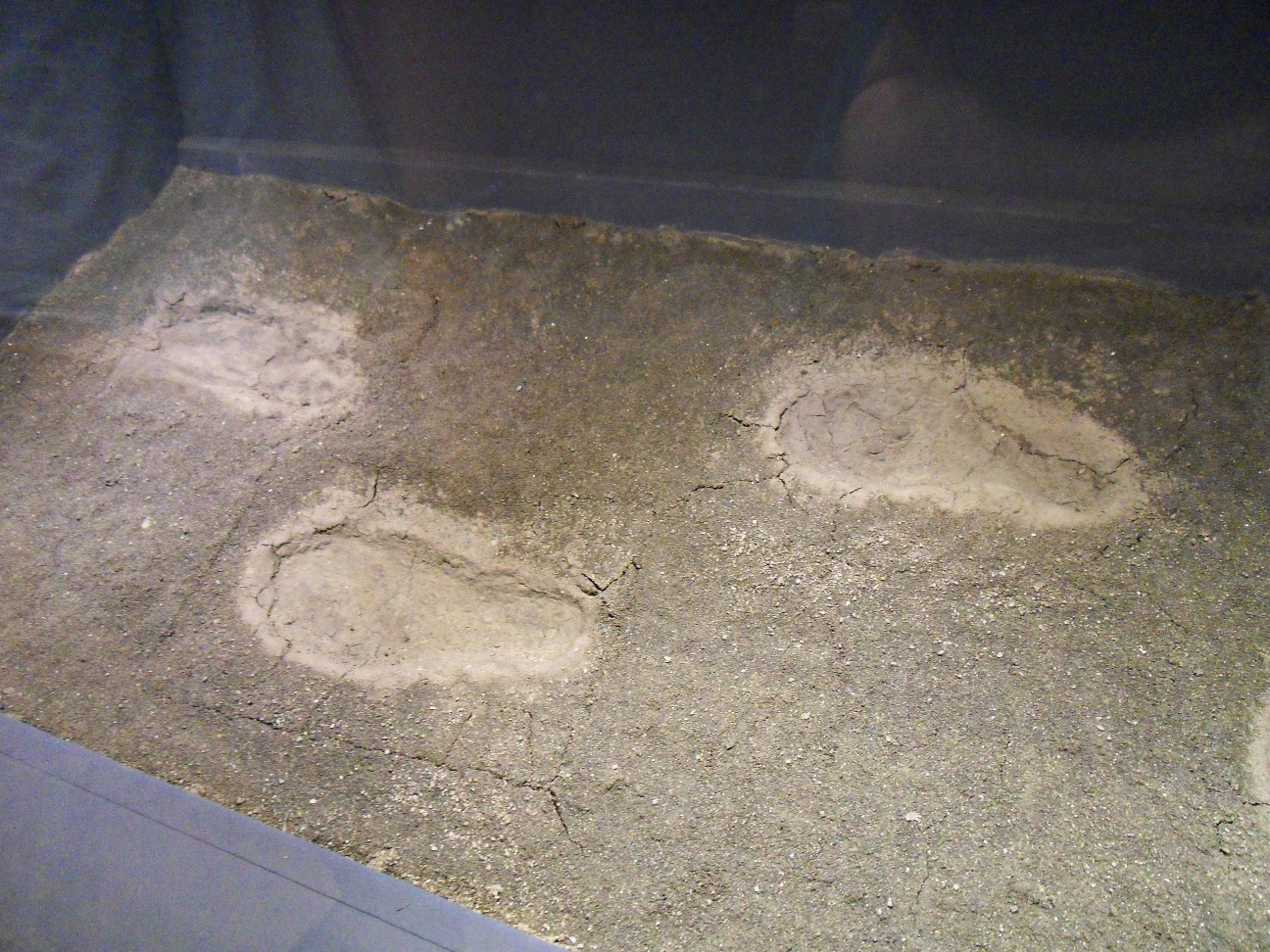
Footprints found at Yenikapı

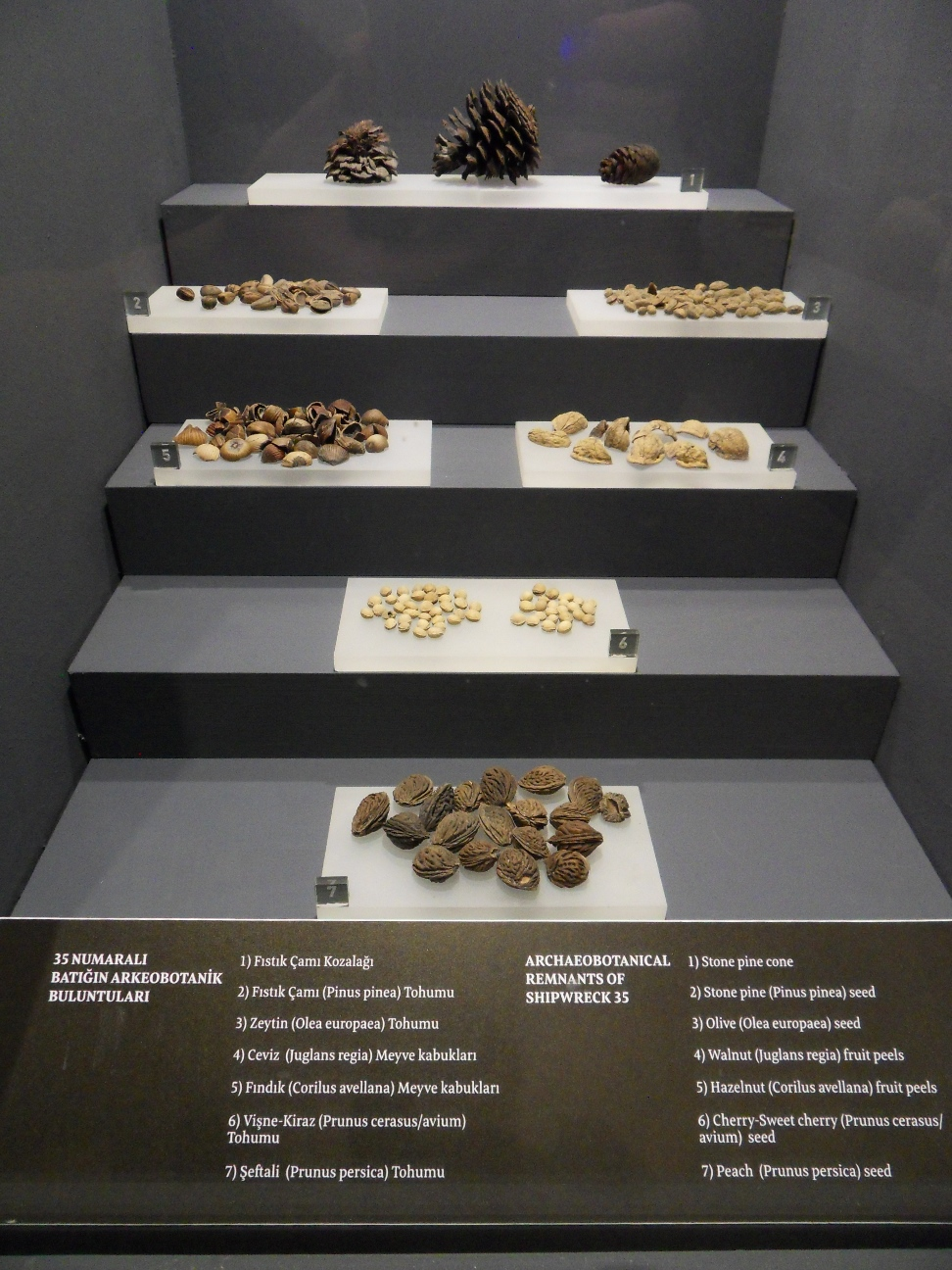
Seeds found at Yenikapı

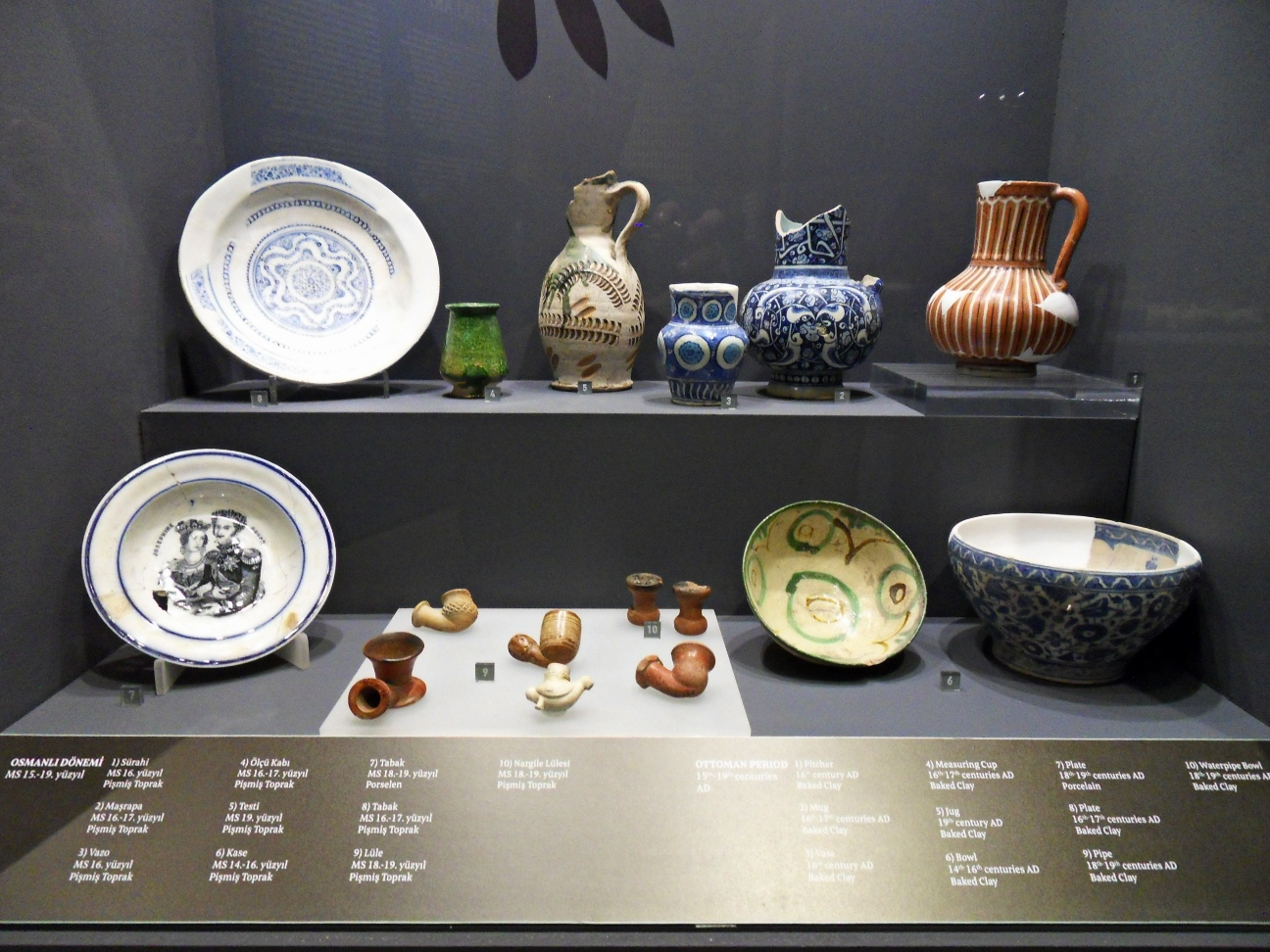
Plates and vessels found at Yenikapı

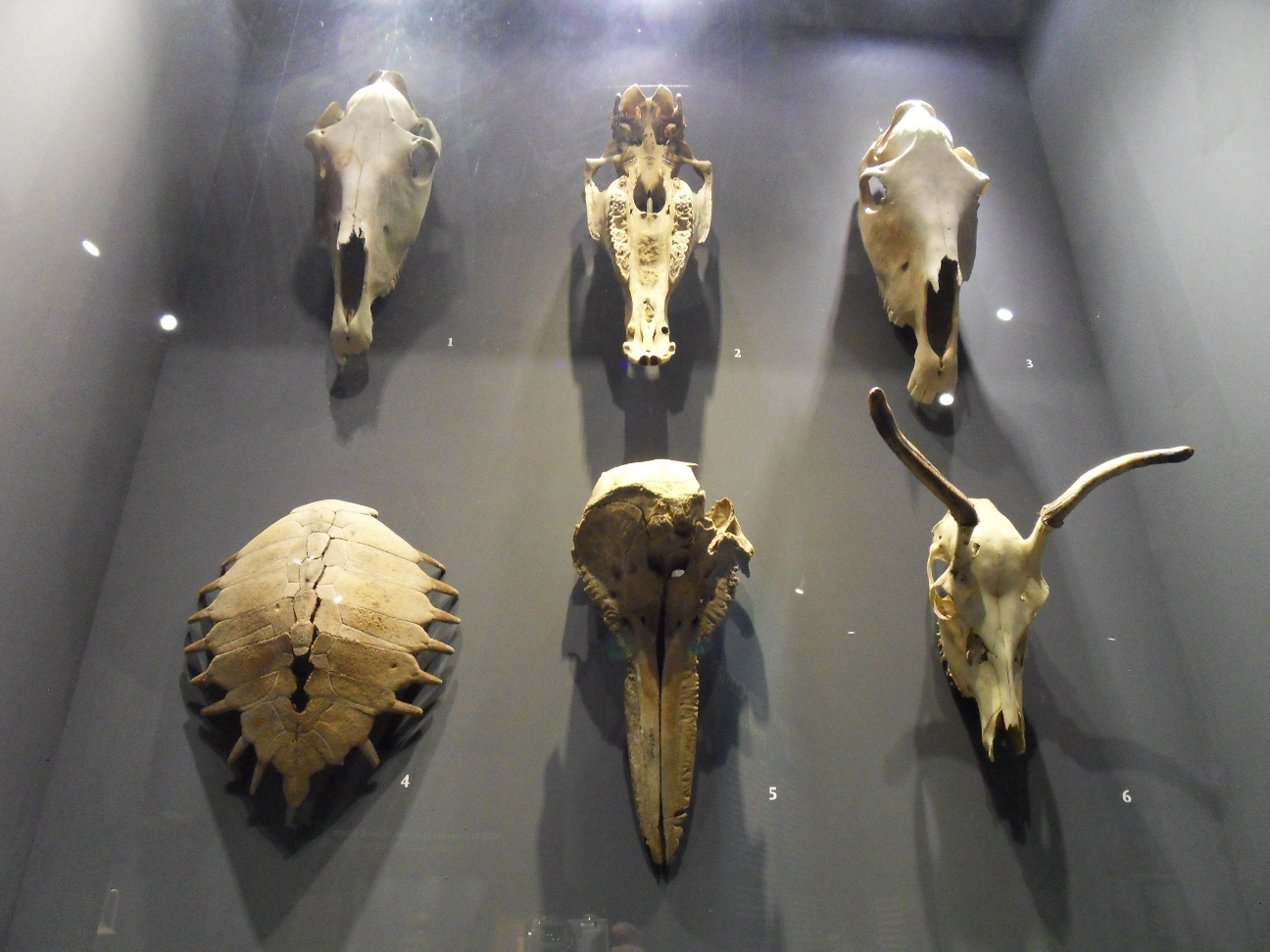
Animal bones found at Yenikapı
