= A View of Trajan's Forum, Rome =

Painting by Charles Lock Eastlake

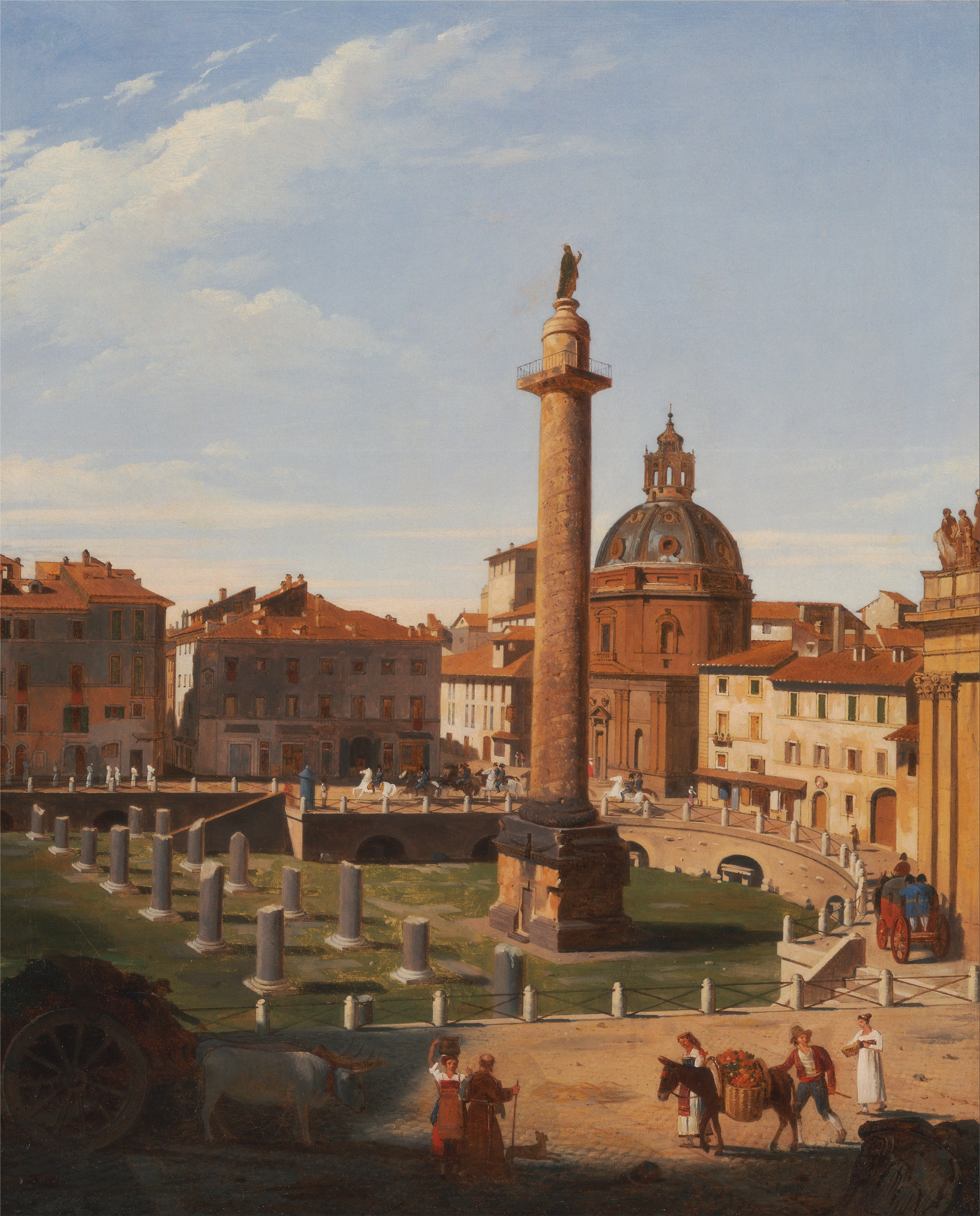
- Version in the Yale Center for British Art
- Artist: Charles Lock Eastlake
- Year: 1821
- Type: Oil on canvas, landscape
- Dimensions: 61.9 cm × 51.1 cm (24.4 in × 20.1 in)
- Location: Yale Center for British Art, New Haven

A View of Trajan's Forum, Rome is an 1821 landscape painting by the British artist Charles Lock Eastlake. It depicts a view of Trajan's Forum in Rome, dominated by Trajan's Column. The scene features both remains of Ancient Rome and much later buildings. Eastlake lived in Rome from 1816 to 1830, at a time when British artists were able to visit the city following the end of the Napoleonic Wars. He produced a number of views of the city, some of which he sent back to exhibit at the Royal Academy's Summer Exhibitions.

Today it is in the collection of the Yale Center for British Art in Connecticut. An alternative version of the work from the same year, covering a wider view of the Forum is now in the collection of the Victoria and Albert Museum in London.

== Bibliography ==
- Liversidge, M.J.H. (ed.) Imagining Rome: British Artists and Rome in the Nineteenth Century. Merrell Holberton, 1996.
- Powell, Cecelia. Italy in the Age of Turner: "The Garden of the World". Merrell Holberton, 1998.
- Slimmon, Anne H. '& Singsen, Judith A. European Painting and Sculpture, Ca. 1770-1937, in the Museum of Art, Rhode Island School of Design. University of Pennsylvania Press, 1991.
