= Temple of Trajan =

Ancient Roman temple

- Shown in ancient Rome
- Interactive map of Temple of Trajan
- 41°53′44″N 12°29′09″E

The Temple of Trajan was a Roman temple dedicated to the emperor Trajan and his wife Plotina after his deification by the Roman Senate. It was built in the Forum of Trajan (Rome), by Trajan's adoptive son and successor Hadrian, between 125 A.D. and 138 A.D. The architect was Apollodorus of Damascus.

== Site ==
Its exact site within the Forum is unknown. It had been assumed it was on the site of Palazzo Valentini and that this palazzo had reused stone from the temple in its construction, but excavation has found no trace of a temple, only remains of insulae with shallower foundations than those needed for a temple. This possibly puts the temple at the centre of the forum courtyard, looking towards the forum of Augustus or elsewhere (some have suggested the two rooms in the Library, without evidence) and not in a northern position as was previously assumed.

== History ==
The temple's dedicatory inscription survives in the Vatican Museums. An enormous monolithic granite column (2m in diameter) with a white marble capital (2.12m high on its own) survives near Trajan's Column and perhaps comes from the temple. Among Hadrian's many buildings, it was only this one to which he wished to affix his name. The temple was probably enormous in dimensions and surrounded by a portico like the temple of Hadrian. However, Trajan was not buried in the temple but in the triumphal column's base.

The temple was destroyed in the Middle Ages.

== See also ==
- List of Ancient Roman temples

== Sources ==
- (in Italian) (traditional) Filippo Coarelli, Guida archeologica di Roma, Arnoldo Mondadori Editore, Verona 1984.
- Martin G. Conde, Rome - Forum of Trajan: Excavations, Discoveries & Restoration Work (1995-2009). Part. 2 - Temple of Trajan (?) / Palazzo Valentini Excavations & Exhibit (2005-2009).
- Martin G. Conde, Rome - Imperial Fora: Metro 'C' Archaeological Surveys (2005-2009). Part. 2 - Pz. Venezia / Pz. Madonna di Loreto. Area S14 / B1 (2004-2009). Area tra ex-Palazzo Bolognetti Torlonia / Palazzo Parracciani Nepoli & Via Macel dei Corvi.
- Claridge, Amanda. “Hadrian’s Lost Temple of Trajan.” Journal of Roman Archaeology 20 (2007): 55–94. https://doi.org/10.1017/S1047759400005316.
- Packer, James E. “Trajan’s Forum Again: The Column and the Temple of Trajan in the Master Plan Attributed to Apollodorus(?).” Journal of Roman Archaeology 7 (1994): 163–82. https://doi.org/10.1017/S1047759400012551.
