= Ulpian Library =

Greek and Latin library in ancient Rome

Coordinates: 41.8957°N 12.4844°E

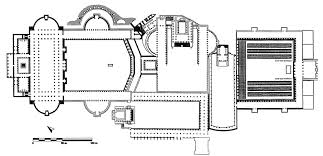
Floor plan of the Forum of Trajan. On the left side of the floor plan are the two library rooms.

The Bibliotheca Ulpia ("Ulpian Library") was a Roman library founded by the Emperor Trajan in AD 114 in the Forum of Trajan, located in ancient Rome. It was considered one of the most prominent and famous libraries of antiquity and became a major library in the Western World upon the destruction of the Library of Alexandria in the 3rd century. It is the only Roman library known to have survived until the Fall of Rome in the mid-fifth century.

== History ==
In 112 AD, the Emperor Trajan commissioned a library to be built in his Forum due north of the Roman Forum at the heart of the Roman Empire. Construction was completed in 114 AD. Upon its completion, the Ulpian Library was the premier library and scholarly center of Rome. “This library was also the Public Record Office of Rome” with over 20,000 scrolls containing records concerning the city’s population. The library was also equipped with presses for storage of both scrolls and books. During excavation, traces of these presses were discovered. The collection of books and scrolls not pertaining to public record, is thought to have been based on the private library of Epaphrodites of Cheronea which contained over 30,000 books and scrolls.

Early in the 4th century, the contents of the Ulpian Library were moved to the Baths of Diocletian, possibly due to repairs as the contents were returned at a later date. Records show that in 455 AD a statue of Sidonius Apollinaris was ordered there by the Emperor Avitus.

== Library layout ==
The Ulpian Library continued in the tradition of Roman imperial libraries with Latin and Greek collections housed separately. In this library, they faced one another across a small colonnaded courtyard that enclosed the Column of Trajan. The library was a two level structure with high vaulted ceilings to take advantage of the natural lighting. The interior walls were divided into bays by columns "set opposite pilasters that framed the niches which held the books and scrolls. There were three steps between the columns that enabled "access to a walkway in front of the bookcases." At the other end of the hall were recesses for a statue on each level, presumably of Trajan and possibly of Minerva. The niches (seven total on each wall) containing recessed wooden bookcases located in both walls running the length of the library along with four others running across the back wall stored the scrolls. Estimates on the amount of scrolls held are "approximately ten thousand" for both Latin and Greek libraries. "In addition, there were archival materials, such as praetorian edicts and senatorial decrees, as well as Caesar's autobiography and Trajan's commentaries on the Dacian Wars, of which now only a few words survive." The space itself was designed to be aesthetically pleasing with desks (plutei) and the books out of sight on shelves and intended for reading, but was not designed with the growth of the collection in mind.

== Reconstruction ==
There are reconstructions both digital and physical that show the external and internal view of the library. The digital reconstruction shows the view from inside the west (Greek) library, through what would have been bronze screens into the portico, where the base of the Column of Trajan can be seen. The library itself faces east, as Vitruvius recommends for libraries, the screens restricting access when the library was not in use and, with the high vaulted ceiling, taking advantage of the morning light. Portions of the floor and the podium of one of the walls survive allowed for the digital reconstruction of the library interior.

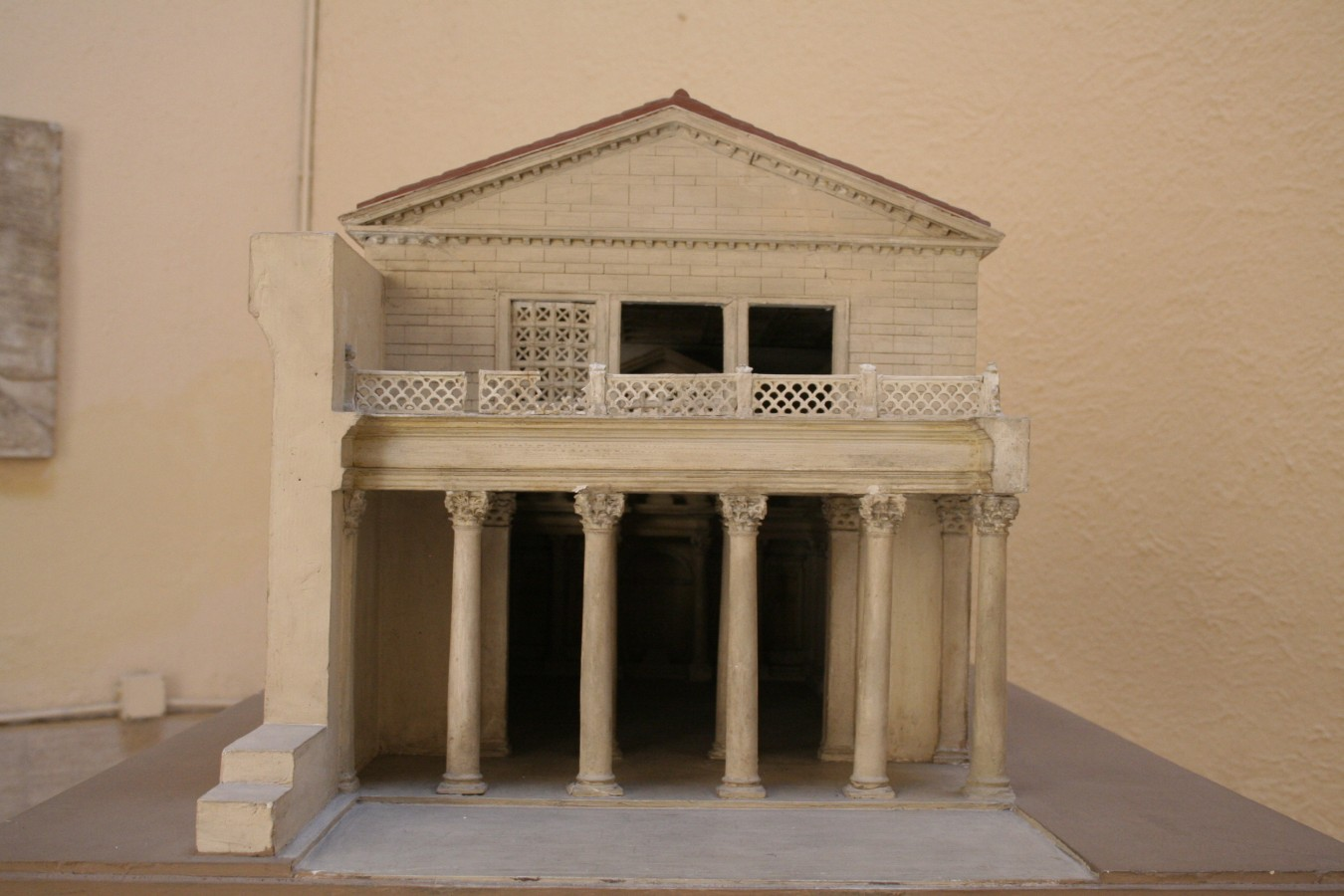

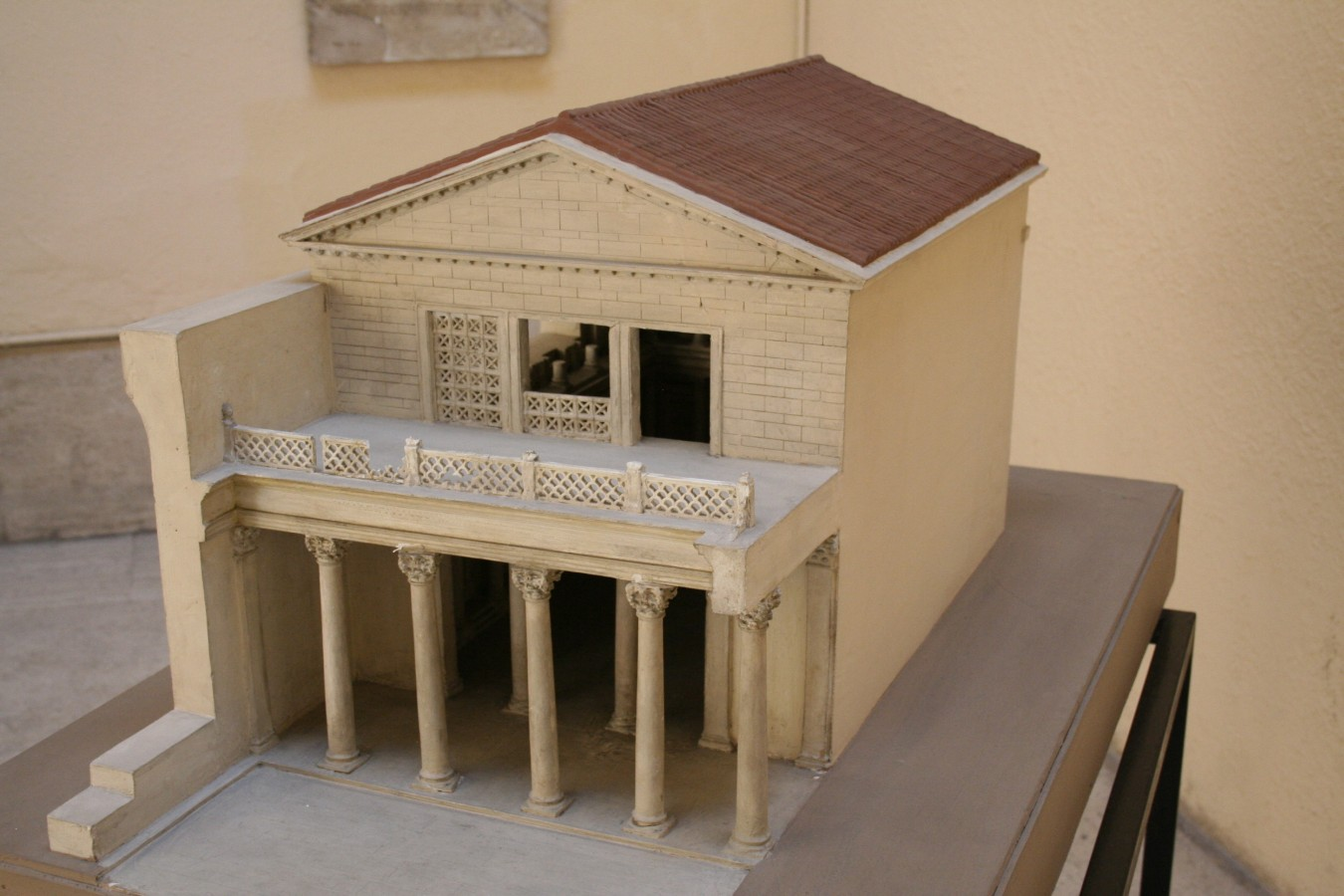

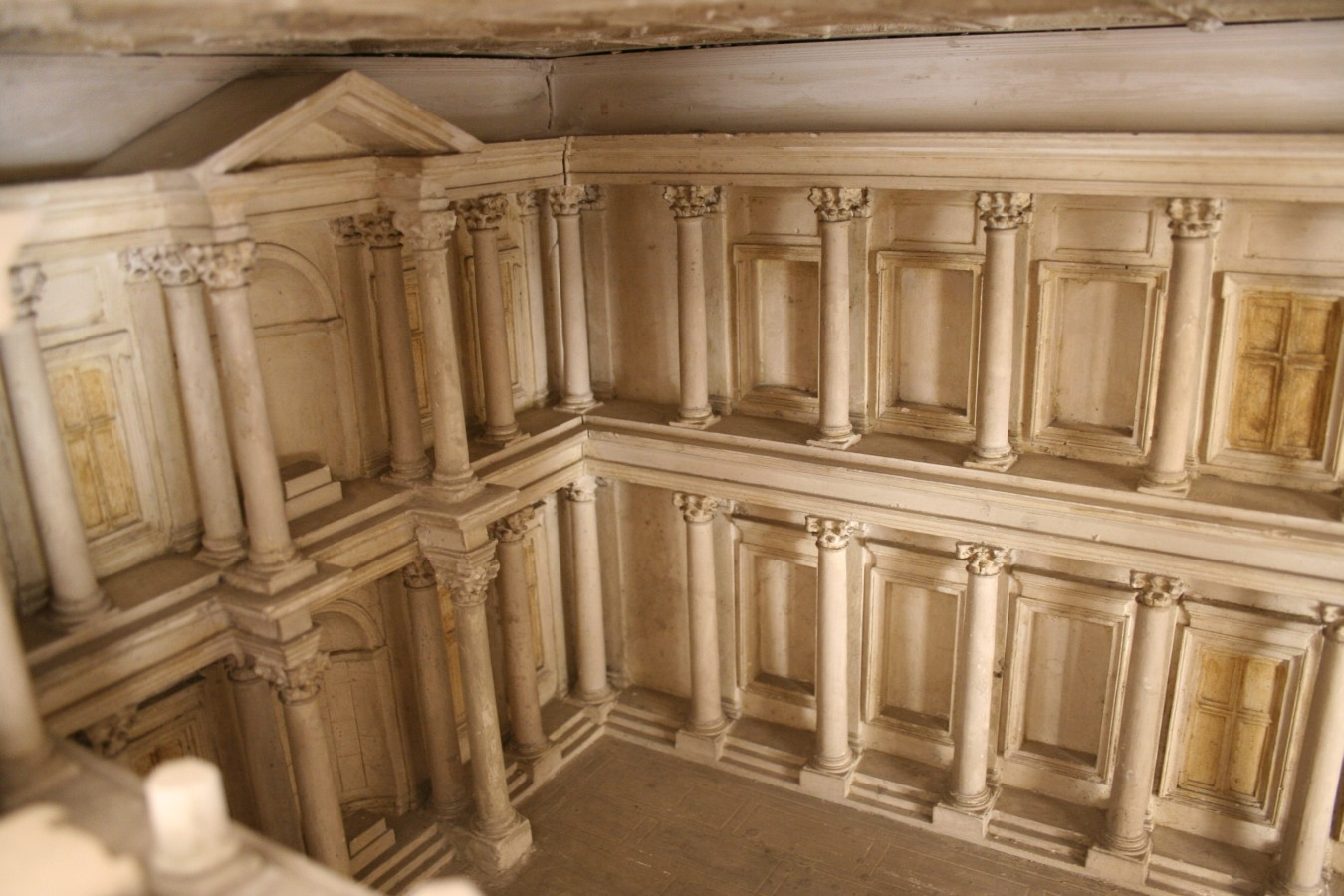

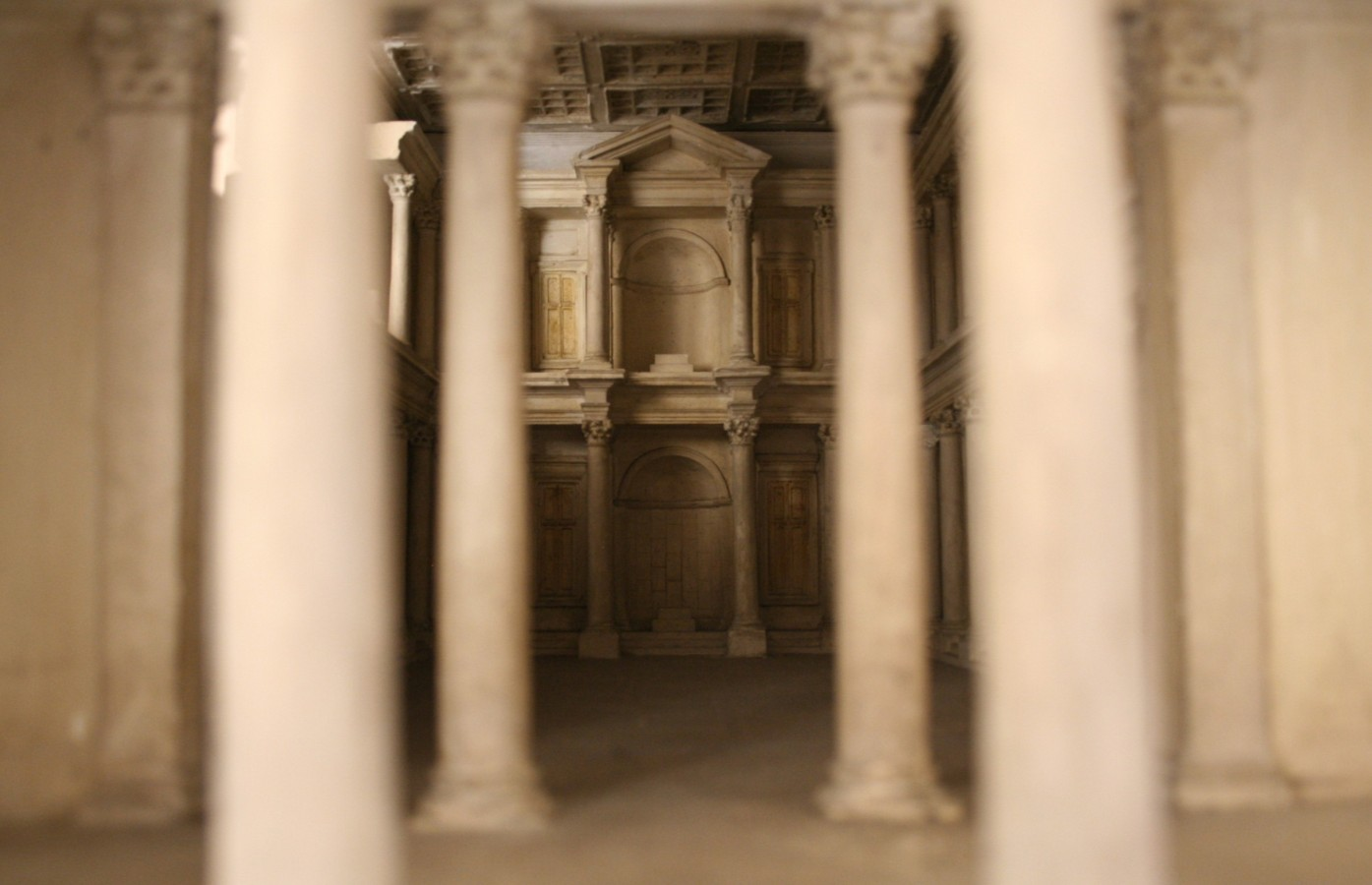
