= Trajan's Column =

Ancient Roman victory column, a landmark of Rome, Italy

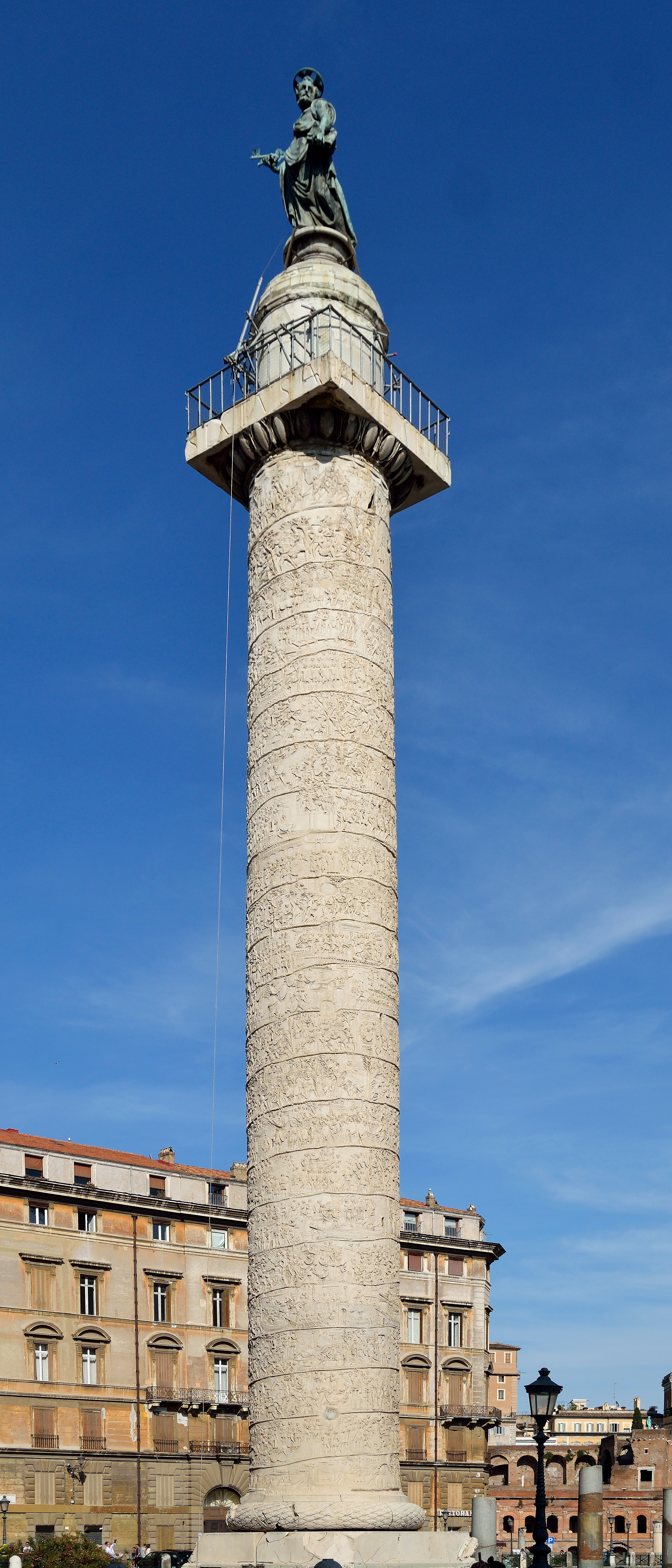
- Trajan's Column, north of the Roman Forum

- Location within Rome
- Click on the map for a fullscreen view
- 41°53′45″N 12°29′03″E
- Type: Roman triumphal column
- Location: Trajan's Forum

History
- Built: AD 107~113; 1913 years ago
- Built by: Trajan

Trajan's Column (Italian: Colonna Traiana, Latin: Columna Traiani) is a Roman triumphal column in Rome, Italy, that commemorates Roman emperor Trajan's victory in the Dacian Wars. It was probably constructed under the supervision of the architect Apollodorus of Damascus at the order of the Roman Senate. It is located in Trajan's Forum, north of the Roman Forum. Completed and dedicated on 12 May 113 AD, the freestanding column is most famous for its spiral bas relief, which depicts the wars between the Romans and Dacians (101–102 and 105–106). Its design has inspired numerous victory columns, both ancient and modern.

The structure is about 30 metres (98 feet) in height, 35 metres (115 feet) including its large pedestal. The shaft is made from a series of 20 colossal Carrara marble (Note: In ancient times, Carrara marble bore the name of Luna marble after the port of Luna, Etruria on the harbor of Luni from which it was shipped after being quarried in the mountains of Carrara.) drums, each weighing about 32 tons, with a diameter of 3.7 metres (12.1 feet). The 190-metre (620-foot) frieze winds around the shaft 23 times. Inside the shaft, a spiral staircase of 185 steps provides access to a viewing deck at the top. The capital block of the column weighs 53.3 tons and had to be lifted to a height of about 34 metres (112 feet). Ancient coins indicate preliminary plans to top the column with a statue of a bird, probably an eagle. After construction, a statue of Trajan was put in place; this disappeared in the Middle Ages. On December 4, 1587, the top was crowned by Pope Sixtus V with a bronze figure of Saint Peter.

Trajan's Column was originally flanked by two sections of the Ulpian Library, a Greek chamber and a Latin chamber, which faced each other and had walls lined with niches and wooden bookcases for scrolls. The Latin chamber likely contained Trajan's lost commentary on the Dacian Wars, the Dacica, which most scholars agree was intended to be echoed in the spiralling, sculpted narrative design of the column.

== Frieze ==
=== Design ===
The column shows 2,662 figures and 155 scenes; Trajan himself appears on the column 58 times.

The continuous helical frieze winds 23 times from base to capital and was an architectural innovation in its time. The design was adopted by later emperors such as Marcus Aurelius. The narrative band expands from about 1 metre (3.3 feet) at the base of the column to 1.2 metres (3.9 feet) at the top. The scenes unfold continuously. Often a variety of different perspectives are used in the same scene, so that more can be revealed (e.g., a different angle is used to show men working behind a wall).

=== Historical content portrayed ===
The relief portrays Trajan's two victorious military campaigns against the Dacians; the lower half illustrating the first (101–102), and the top half illustrating the second (105–106). These campaigns were contemporary to the time of the column's construction. The frieze repeats standardized scenes of imperial address (adlocutio), sacrifice (lustratio), and the army setting out on campaign (profectio). Scenes of battle are very much a minority on the column; instead it emphasizes images of orderly soldiers carrying out ceremony and construction. The aim of the Dacian campaigns was to incorporate and integrate Dacia into the Roman Empire as a province. On Trajan's Column, imagery related to wartime violence in general seems to have been downplayed and depictions of violent action towards foreign women and children are nonexistent. Some scholars suggest the lack of battle scenes and large number of construction scenes was meant to speak to the urban population of Rome (the primary audience), addressing their fear and distrust of the army by depicting its warfare as one with little collateral damage. The portrayal of the Roman army as relatively gentle may have been designed to support Trajan's image as a man of "justice, clemency, moderation, and restraint". Others have argued that the number of tree-felling scenes on the Column (48 of the 224 trees on the Column are being felled) work alongside the bridging of the Danube at the base, and are meant to speak to a more total conquest of the province than had previously been achieved. Key specific events portrayed are the first crossing of the Danube by the Roman legion, Trajan's voyage up the Danube, the surrender of the Dacians at the close of the first war, the great sacrifice by the Danube bridge during the second war, the assault on the Dacian capital, and the death of the Dacian king Decebalus. The two sections are separated by a personification of victory writing on a shield flanked on either side by trophies.

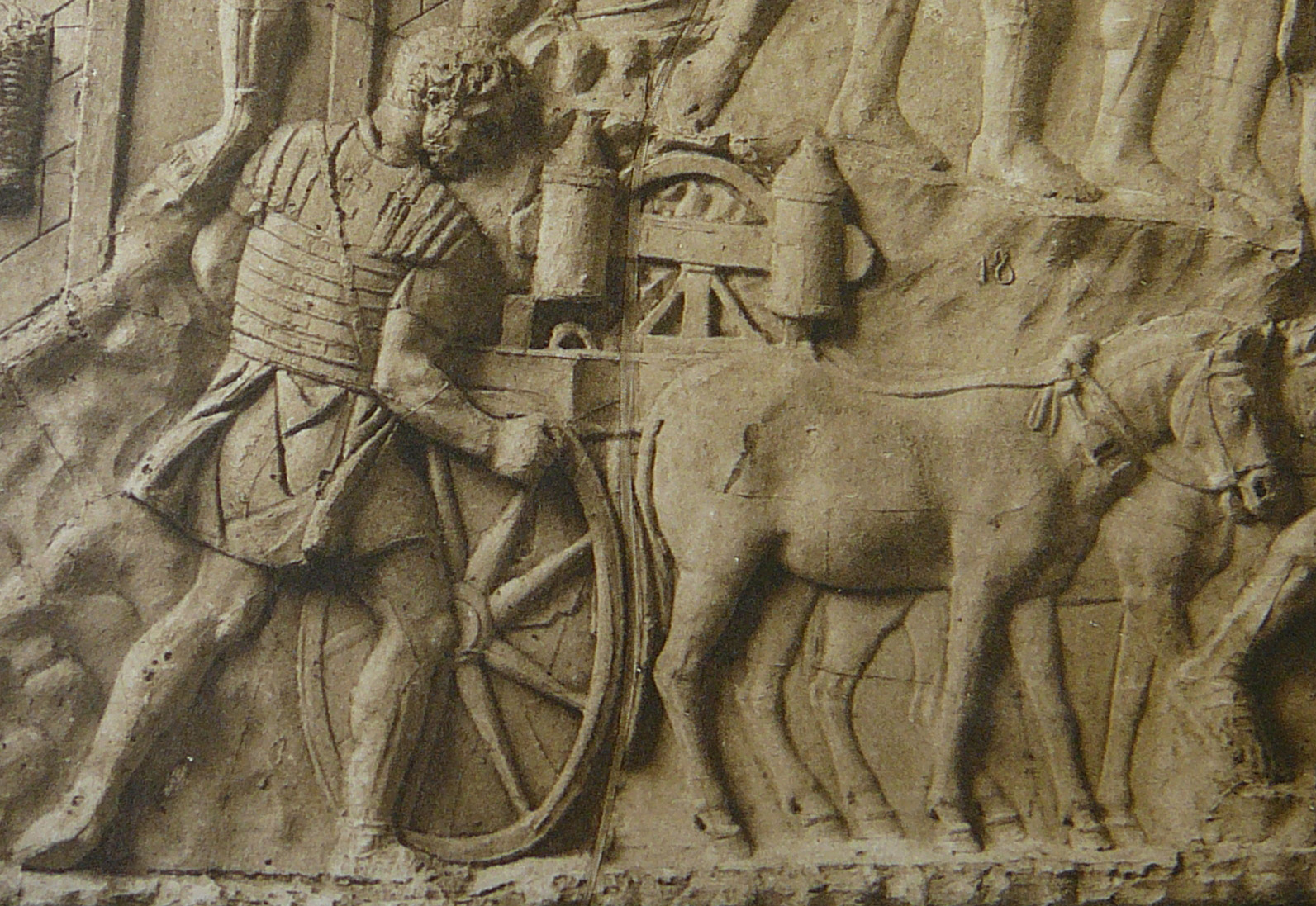
Roman carroballista, a cart-mounted field artillery weapon (relief detail)

Great care was taken to distinguish the men and women from both sides of the campaign as well as the ranks within these distinct groups. The scenes are crowded with sailors, soldiers, statesmen and priests, showing about 2,500 figures in all. It also exists as a valuable source of information on Roman and barbarian arms and methods of warfare (such as forts, ships, weapons, etc.) and costume. The relief shows details such as a ballista or catapult. This detail is evident in the variety of trees on the Column, each individually stylised following 37 types, which has led some scholars to identify particular species. The precise details create a strong effect of verisimilitude; the designer presents the images as objective historical truth. The emperor Trajan is depicted realistically in the veristic style, making 58 appearances as the central hero among his troops.

Women for the most part occupy and define the margins of the scenes. However, mortal females in Roman state art are so rare it is remarkable that they are included at all in a war monument. In the male discourse of warfare, women are a visual trope that develops further the idea of subjugation by feminizing the foreign conquered. However, on the column is "one of the most unusual, disturbing, and violent depictions of women in Roman art, the torture scene." In this unusual scene, four Dacian women are depicted torturing two naked men.

== Setting ==
Trajan's Column is the most prominent architectural feature of Trajan's Forum, left nearly intact but now isolated from its original setting. The column was placed toward the northernmost point of the forum, acting as the focal point of the entire forum complex. It was surrounded on three sides by two flanking libraries and the Basilica Ulpia. The two libraries to the northeast and southwest of the column were for the study of scrolls written in Latin and in Greek. These libraries were built in tandem with the column. They apparently included upper level viewing platforms for two sides of the column. By having an elevated vantage point, the figures of the scenes, carved in shallow relief and detailed with paint and metal fittings, could be seen more closely (nevertheless it remained impossible for the ancient viewer to follow sequentially the continuous spiral of the reliefs). The problem with visibility of the upper areas is further apparent when we compare Trajan's Column to the Column of Marcus Aurelius. The figures in the later Column of Marcus Aurelius are more deeply cut and even simplified over the height of the shaft because there were no surrounding buildings to serve as viewing platforms. The different carving style seems to have been adopted to enhance visibility.

The two libraries flanking the column helped to further the emperor's program of propaganda. In addition to serving as viewing platforms for the column, they housed valuable works of literature for the people of Rome. Surely one important text kept here was Trajan's own account of the Dacian Wars, now lost. The reliefs on the column documenting the Dacian campaigns would have provided a vivid complement to Trajan's account of the wars. The people of Rome were reminded of his victories every time they enjoyed the open space and amenities of the forum. The combination of the column and the magnificent buildings that surrounded it would have created an awe-inspiring spectacle.

== Purpose ==
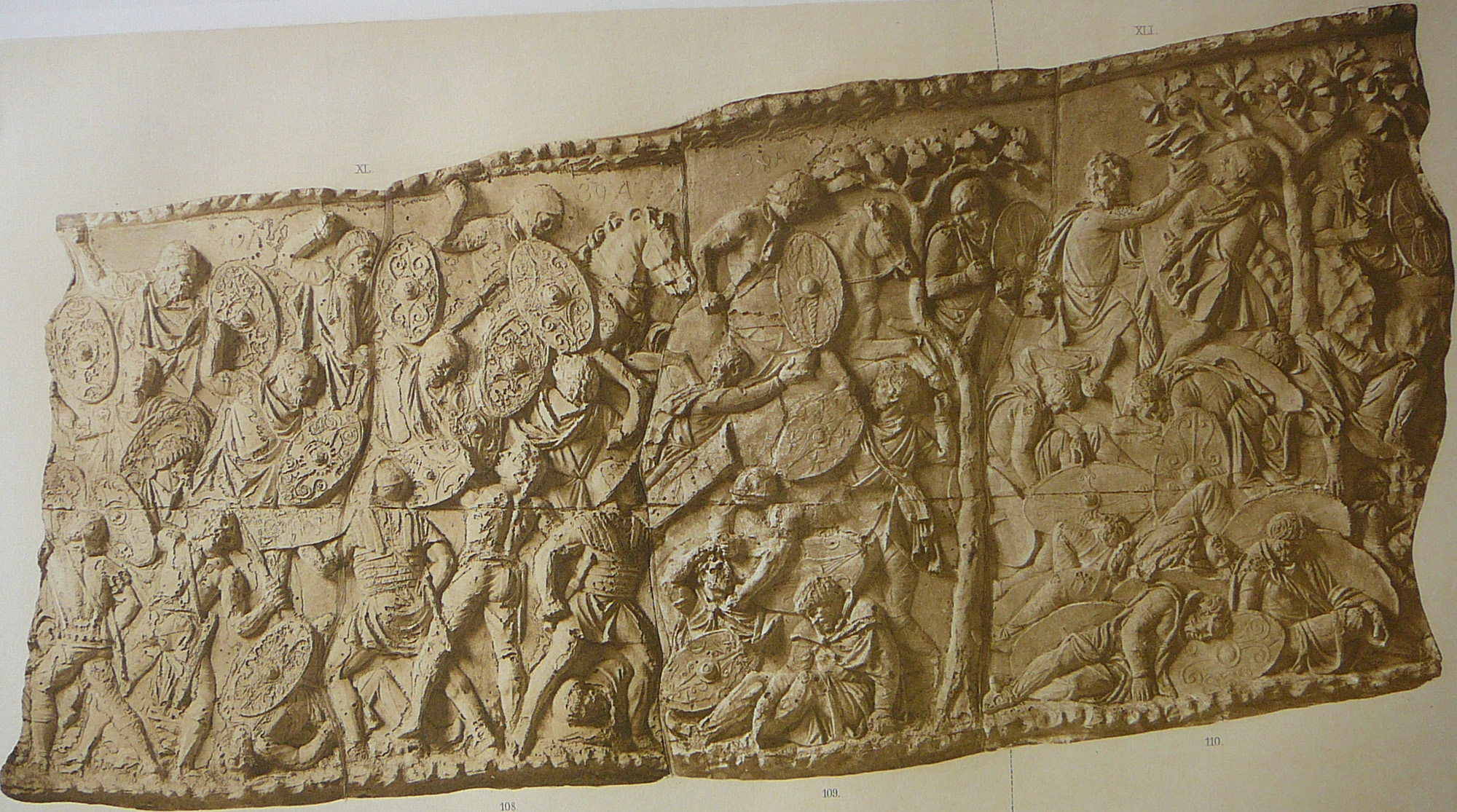
Battle scene between the Roman and Dacian armies

It is unclear whether the column was meant to serve a commemorative function, as political propaganda, or both. Traditional scholarship held that the column was a glorifying monument, upholding Trajan as Rome's great emperor. However, recent reconstructions of Trajan's Forum have determined that any wide view of the column would have been mostly obstructed by two libraries in the forum which tightly bookended it. Also, because it would have been difficult to follow the spiral frieze from end to end (walking in circles with head inclined), the column's narrative power would have been fairly limited.

On the other hand, as French archaeologist Paul Veyne notes, the relief could be read "vertically" from below, with the figure of the emperor recognizable across the bands of images—just as, on the Colonne Vendôme, Napoleon's figure can be picked up, scene after scene. Additionally, the two libraries surrounding it provided platforms from which to observe the column if the viewer stood on the top floors, making the complete view of frieze much more visible.

While there is certainly evidence that the Trajan's Column was not put in an ideal spot for visibility, it is impossible to reject the column as some form of a glorification structure. There is the significant point that the column was extremely challenging to construct, so it is unlikely that it would have been placed in the forum with the intentions of being hidden or out of plain sight.

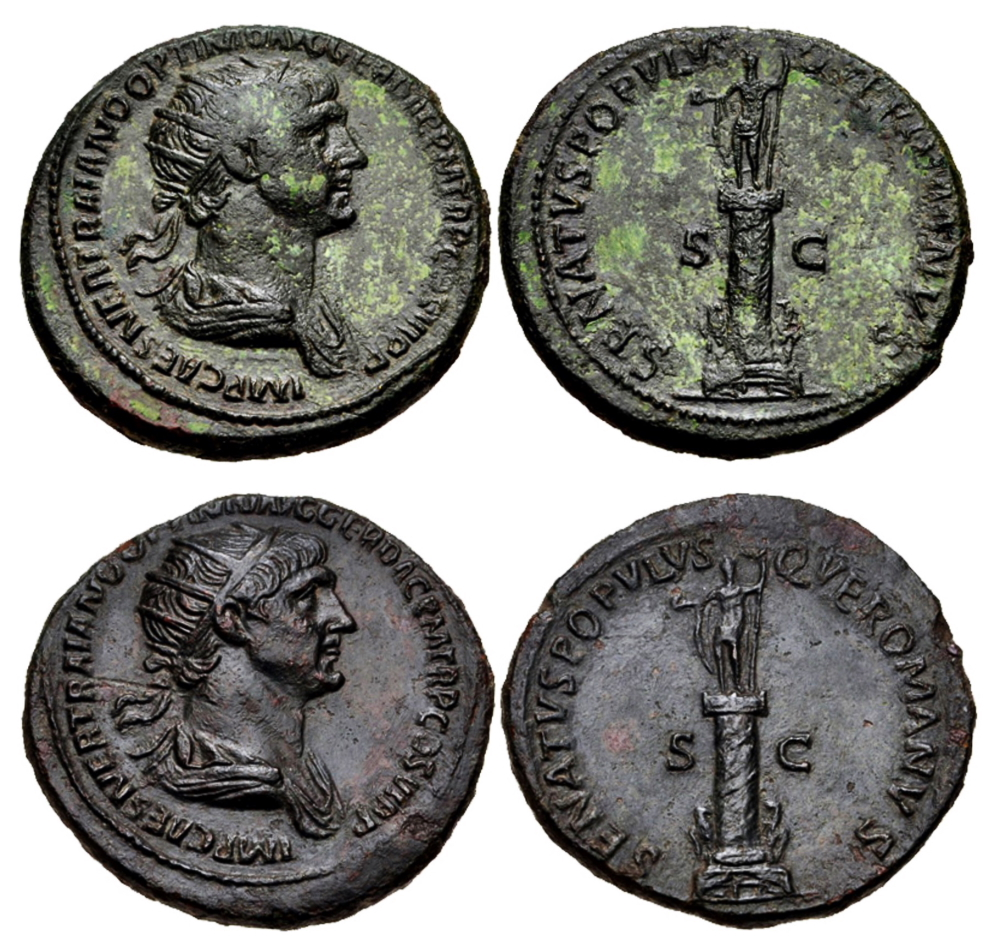
Two examples of dupondius struck 114–116 AD, showing Trajan's column with the original statue on top and his portrait

There is also the idea of the column as a symbol for Trajan. Although ancient coins indicate preliminary plans to top the column with a statue of a bird, probably an eagle, a statue of Trajan was put in place after the column was constructed. Additionally, Trajan's ashes were buried at the ground level of the forum, which is a center of life for Romans. The narrative on Trajan's Column unfurls from the base going up, taking a viewer through Trajan's triumph in the Dacian wars and (as originally constructed) finished with a statue of Trajan above the forum. Considering the practice of deification of emperors which was expected during this time period, especially of glorious Trajan, the symbolism may be interpreted as Trajan's earthly remains staying in the forum with the Roman people while his conquests ascend him up into the heavens.

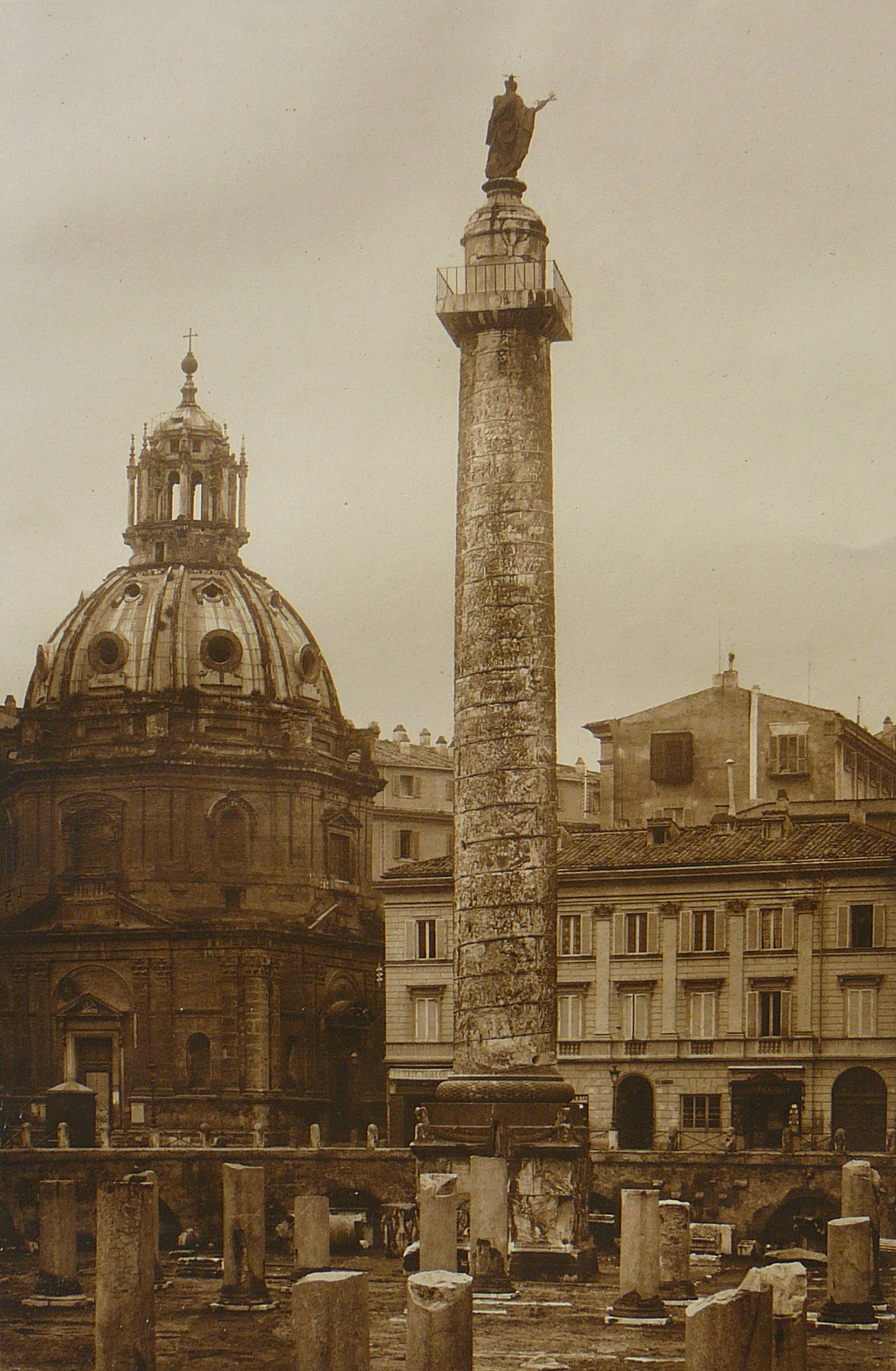
Trajan's Column around 1896

After Trajan's death in 117, the Roman Senate voted to have Trajan's ashes buried in a chamber at the column's square base, which is decorated with captured Dacian arms and armor. His ashes and those of his wife, Plotina, were set inside the base in golden urns (which later disappeared from the monument). One reading of this is that Trajan may have intended the column to be his final resting place from the project's inception, and that the similarities in design to other funerary structures made it a natural choice for the Roman Senate. In particular, the circumambulation demanded of onlookers of the column's frieze is evocative of Roman funerary practice, drawing attention toward the center – and consequently, the finial of Trajan.

The statue of Trajan disappeared in the Middle Ages. On December 4, 1587, the top was crowned by Pope Sixtus V with a bronze figure of Saint Peter, which remains.

== Inscription ==
The inscription on the base of Trajan's Column, which uses Roman square capitals

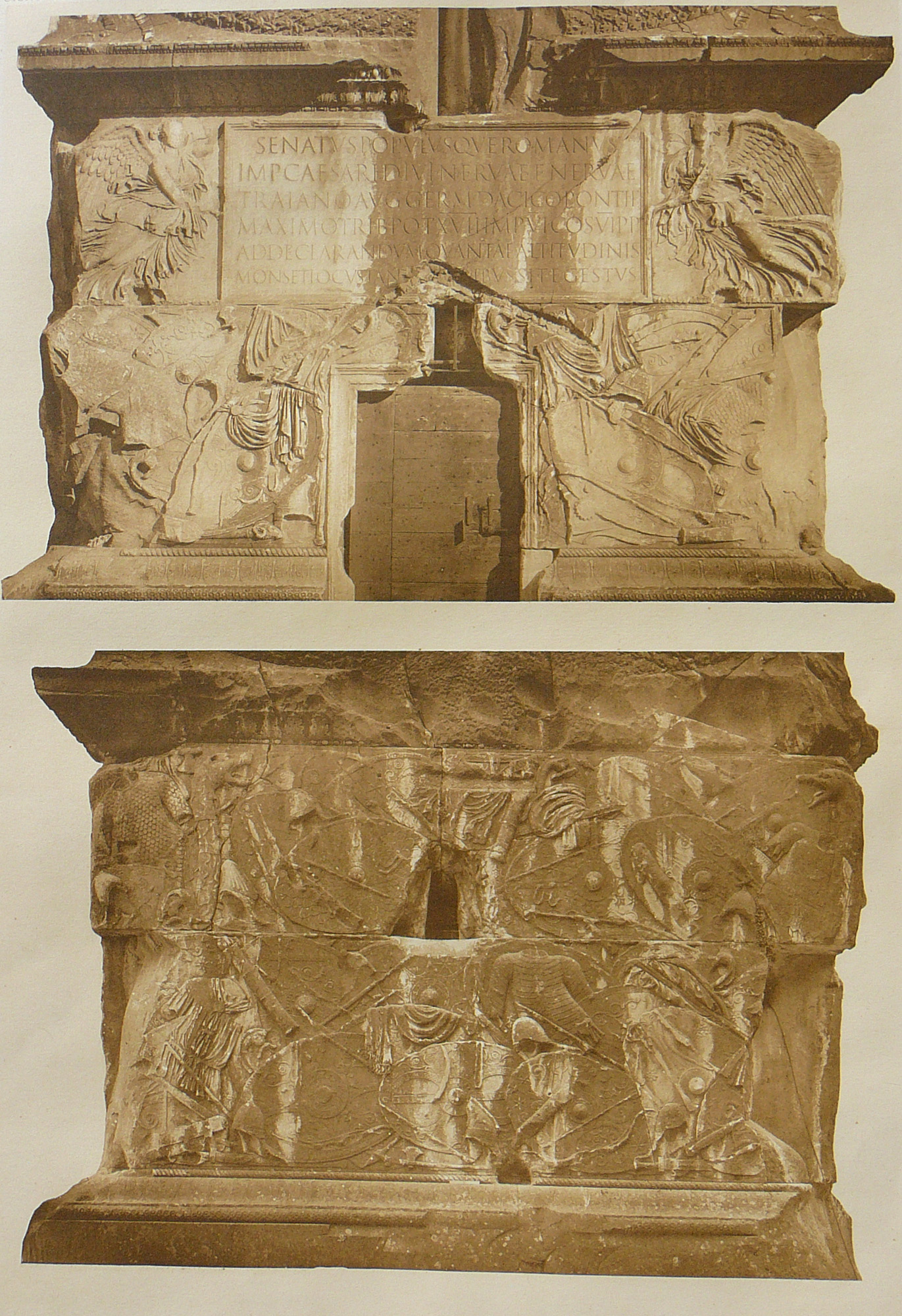
Location of the inscription plate, above the entrance to the interior (upper image)

The inscription at the base of the column reads:

SENATVS⸱POPVLVS⸱QVE⸱ROMANVS
IMP⸱CAESARI⸱DIVI⸱NERVAE⸱F⸱NERVAE
TRAIANO⸱AVG⸱GERM⸱DACICO⸱PONTIF
MAXIMO⸱TRIB⸱POT⸱X̅V̅I̅I̅⸱IMP⸱V̅I̅⸱COS⸱V̅I̅⸱P⸱P
AD⸱DECLARANDVM⸱QVANTAE⸱ALTITVDINIS
MONS⸱ET⸱LOCVS⸱TANT[IS⸱OPER] (Note: The final line is damaged, due to later building work, but the contents of the short lacuna have been inferred by historians.)IBVS⸱SIT⸱EGESTVS

Translated to English:

The Senate and People of Rome, to the Divine Emperor Caesar Nerva Trajan, son of Nerva, High Priest, [conqueror of] Germany and Dacia, [vested] with the power of the tribune 17 [times], imperator 6 [times], consul 6 [times], father of the nation, for demonstrating [that] a mountain and a place of such height were excavated for such works.

According to British historian Edward Gibbon, the height of the column indicated the original elevation of the hill excavated for the forum. It was believed that the column was supposed to stand where the saddle between the Capitoline and Quirinal Hills used to be, having been excavated by Trajan, but excavation has revealed that this is not the case. The saddle was where Trajan's Forum and Trajan's Market stood. Hence, the inscription refers to the Trajan's entire building project in the area of the Imperial fora.

This is perhaps the most famous example of Roman square capitals, a script often used for stone monuments and, less often, for manuscript writing. As it was meant to be read from below, the bottom letters are slightly smaller than the top letters, to give proper perspective. Some, but not all, word divisions are marked with a dot, and many of the words, especially the titles, are abbreviated. In the inscription, numerals are marked with a titulus, a bar across the top of the letters. A small piece at the bottom of the inscription has been lost.

The typeface Trajan, designed in 1989 by Carol Twombly, uses letter forms based on this inscription, working from the research of Edward Catich. There have been many other typefaces based on the inscription from such designers as Frederic Goudy and Warren Chappell.

== Spiral stair ==
Section view of the pedestal and the interior stairway of Trajan's Column.

The interior of Trajan's Column is hollow: entered by a small doorway at one side of the base, a spiral stair of 185 steps gives access to the platform above, having offered the visitor in antiquity a view over the surrounding Trajan's Forum; 43 window slits illuminate the ascent.

The column stands 38.4 m (126 ft) high from the ground to the top of the statue base: Located immediately next to the large Basilica Ulpia, it had to be constructed sufficiently tall in order to function as a vantage point and to maintain its own visual impact on the forum. The column proper, that is the shaft without the pedestal, the statue and its base, is 29.76 metres (97.64 feet) high, a number which almost corresponds to 100 Roman feet; beginning slightly above the bottom of the base, the helical staircase inside measures a mere 8 cm (3 in) less.

The column is composed of 29 blocks of Luni marble, weighing in total more than 1100 t. The spiral stair itself was carved out of 19 blocks, with a full turn every 14 steps; this arrangement required a more complex geometry than the more usual alternatives of 12 or 16. The quality of the craftsmanship was such that the staircase is practically even, and the joints between the huge blocks still fit accurately. Despite numerous earthquakes in the past, the column today leans at an angle of less than half a degree.

Trajan's Column, especially its helical stairway design, exerted a considerable influence on subsequent Roman architecture. While spiral stairs were before still a rare sight in Roman buildings, this space-saving form henceforth spread gradually throughout the empire. Apart from the practical advantages it offered, the design also became closely associated with imperial power, being later adopted by Trajan's successors Antoninus Pius and Marcus Aurelius. In Napoleon's time, a similar column decorated with a spiral of relief sculpture was erected in the Place Vendôme in Paris to commemorate his victory at Austerlitz.

== Construction ==
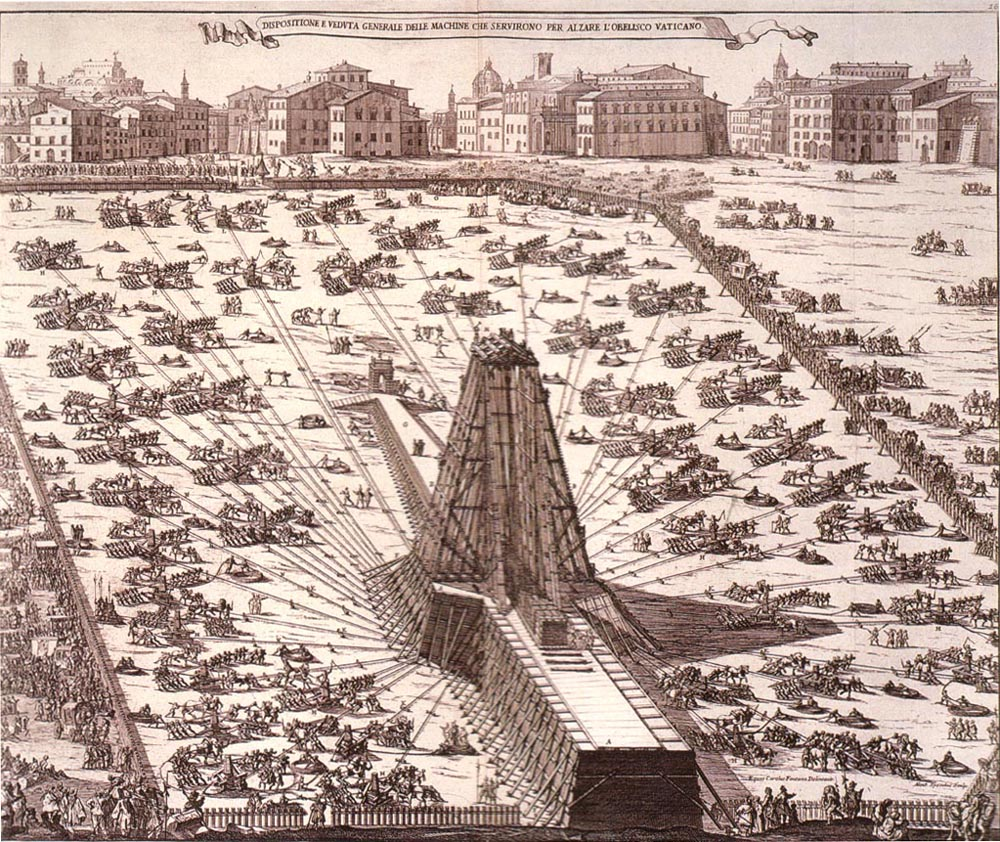
Erection of the Vatican obelisk in 1586 by means of a lifting tower. A similar arrangement was presumably used for the construction of Trajan's Column, but with less available space and thus manpower.

It is assumed that the column drums were lifted by cranes into their place. Ancient sources, as well as a substantial body of archaeological evidence, show that Roman engineers were capable of raising large weights clear off the ground. The typical drum of Trajan's Column weighs c. 32 t, while the capital, the heaviest block above the base and pedestal, is even at 53.3 t, which had to be lifted 34 m (112 ft) high. To save weight, the treads had probably been carved out before either at the quarry or in situ.

Even so, for such loads, the typical Roman treadwheel crane, which could only reach a maximum height of 15 to 18 metres (49–59 feet) in any event, was clearly inadequate. Instead, a tower-like wooden construction was erected around the building site, in the midst of which the marble blocks were raised by a system of pulleys, ropes and capstans; these were powered by a large workforce of men and possibly also draught animals, spread out on the ground. According to modern calculations, eight capstans were needed to hoist the 55 t base block, while the length of rope required for the highest drums measured some 210 metres (690 feet) assuming two-block pulleys.

Such a lifting tower was later also used to great effect by the Renaissance architect Domenico Fontana to relocate obelisks in Rome. From his report, it becomes obvious that the coordination of the lift between the various pulling teams required a considerable amount of concentration and discipline, since, if the force was not applied evenly, the excessive stress on the ropes would make them rupture. In case of Trajan's Column, the difficulties were exacerbated even further by the simultaneous work on the neighbouring Basilica Ulpia, which limited the available space so that the capstan crews had proper access only from one side.

== Reproductions ==
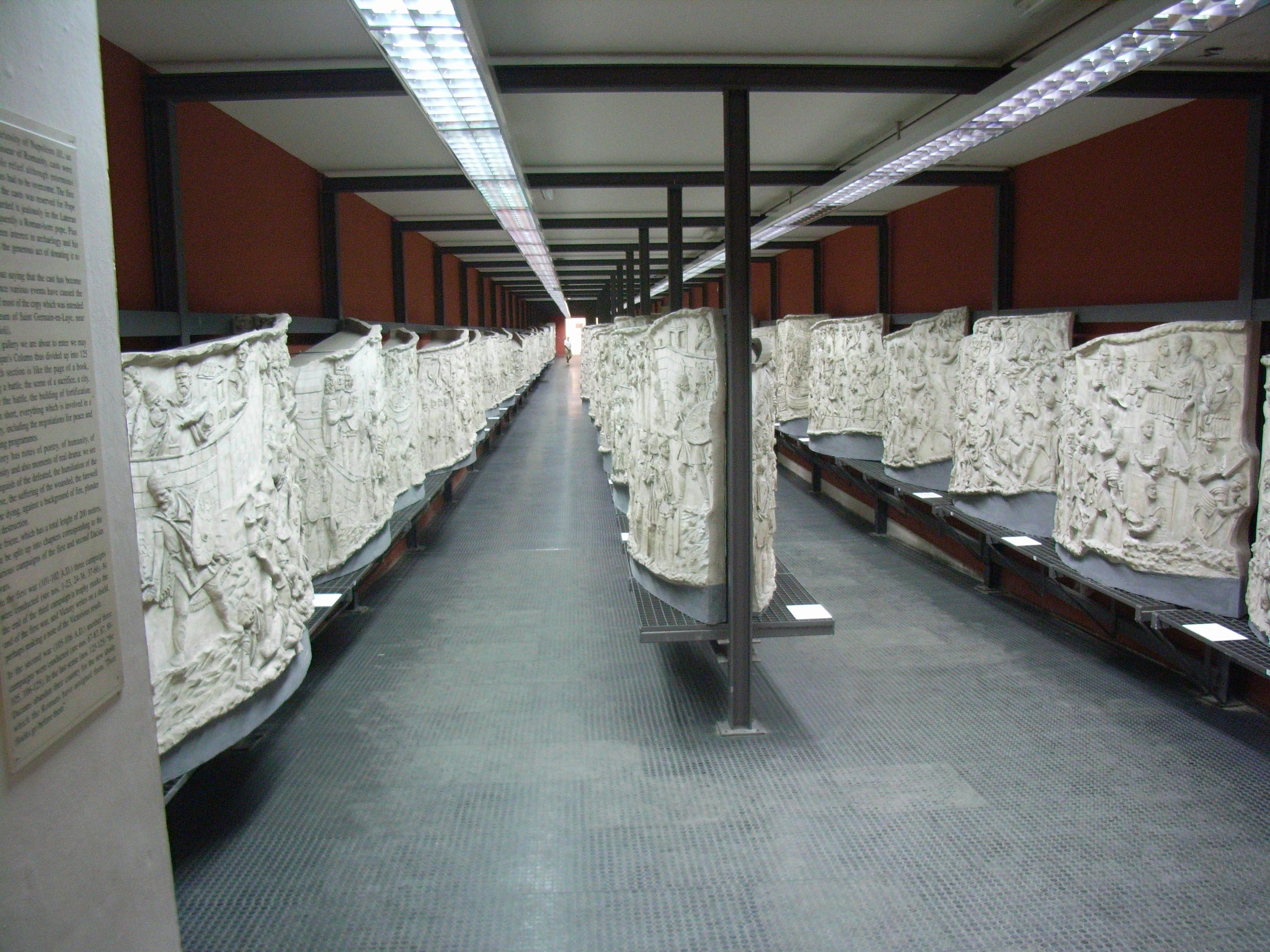
The plaster casts laid out at eye level in the Museum of Roman Civilization in Rome

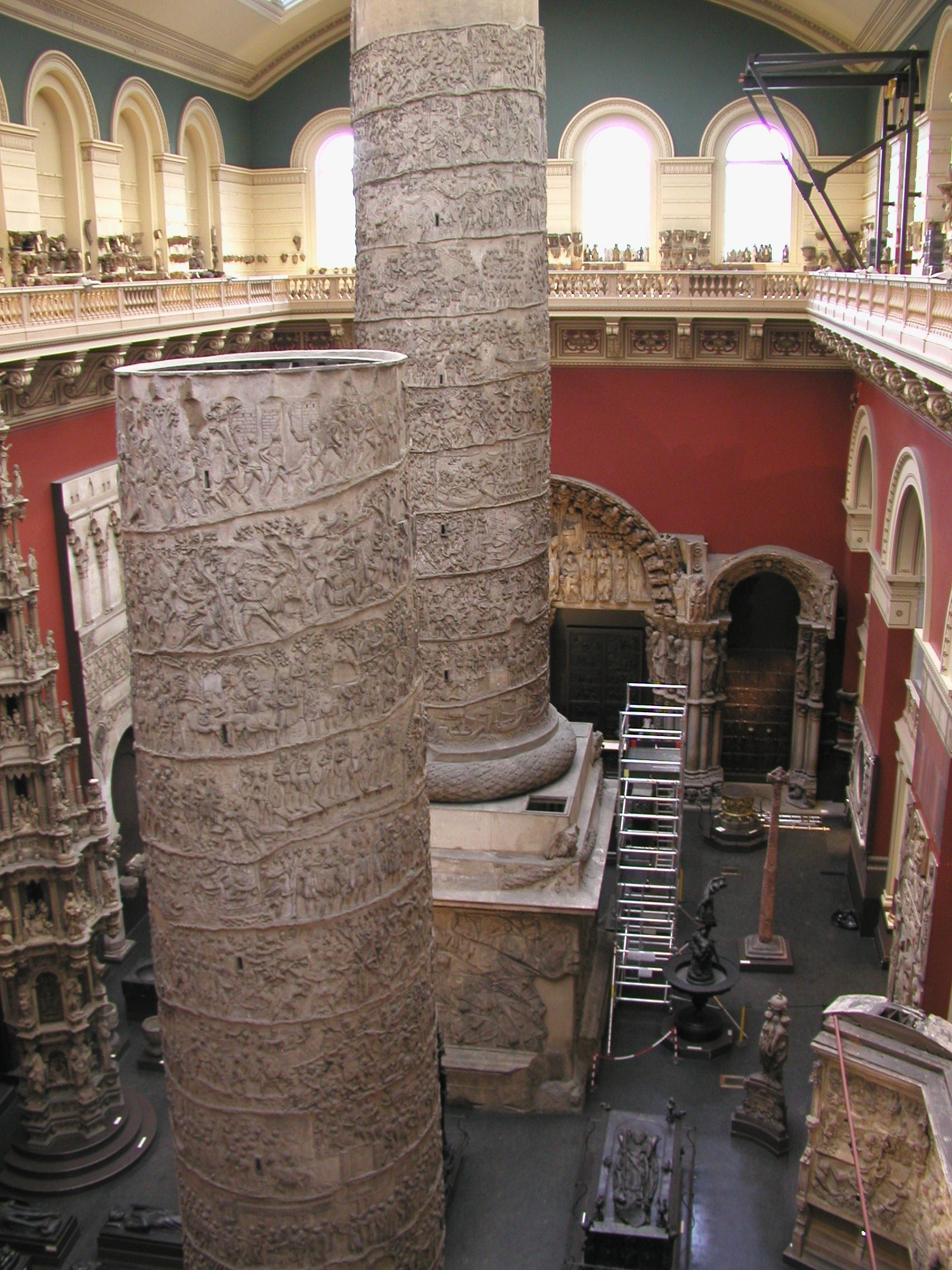
View of the plaster cast displayed in London's Victoria and Albert Museum

Plaster casts of the relief were taken in the 19th and 20th centuries. After a century of acid pollution, they are now more legible in some details than the original, and the way they are displayed offers students a closer look at the reliefs than at the original site. Examples can be studied at:

- Museum of Roman Civilization in Rome, where each "frame" of the narrative has been cut into a separate section and the sections are then displayed horizontally in order
- National Museum of Romanian History, Bucharest, Romania, which displays the frieze horizontally in segments
- Cast Courts at the Victoria and Albert Museum, London. Displayed in column form and, including the base, the column is separated into two halves.
- Archaeological Collection of the University of Zürich, University of Zürich

Additionally, individual casts of the frieze are on display in various museums, for example, in the Museum for Ancient Navigation in Mainz. A complete survey in monochrome was published by the German archaeologist Conrad Cichorius between 1896 and 1900 (see Commons), still forming the base of modern scholarship. Based on Cichorius's work, and on the photographic archive of the German Archaeological Institute, a research-oriented Web-based viewer for Trajan's Column was created at the German-language image database.

== Dimensions ==
- Height of base: 1.7 metres (5.58 feet)
- + Height of shaft: 26.92 metres (88.32 feet)
  - Typical height of drums: 1.521 metres (4.990 feet)
  - Diameter of shaft: 3.695 metres (12.123 feet)
- + Height of capital: 1.16 metres (3.81 feet)
- = Height of column proper: 29.78 metres (97.70 feet)
  - Height of helical part of stair: 29.68 metres (97.38 feet) (c. 100 Roman feet)
- Height of column, excluding plinth: 28.91 metres (94.85 feet)
- + Height of pedestal, including plinth: 6.16 metres (20.21 feet)
- = Height of top of column above ground: 35.07 metres (115.06 feet)

== Images ==
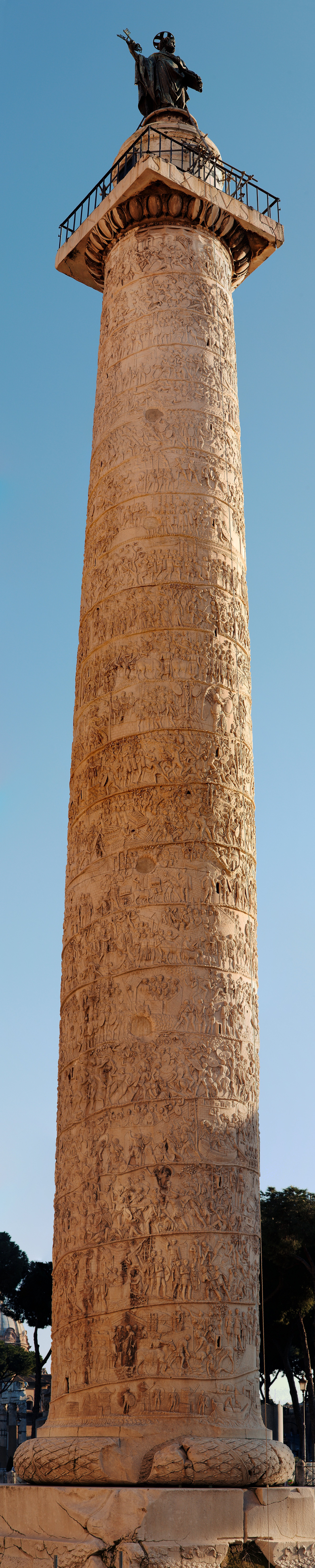
Detailed view of north side (high resolution)

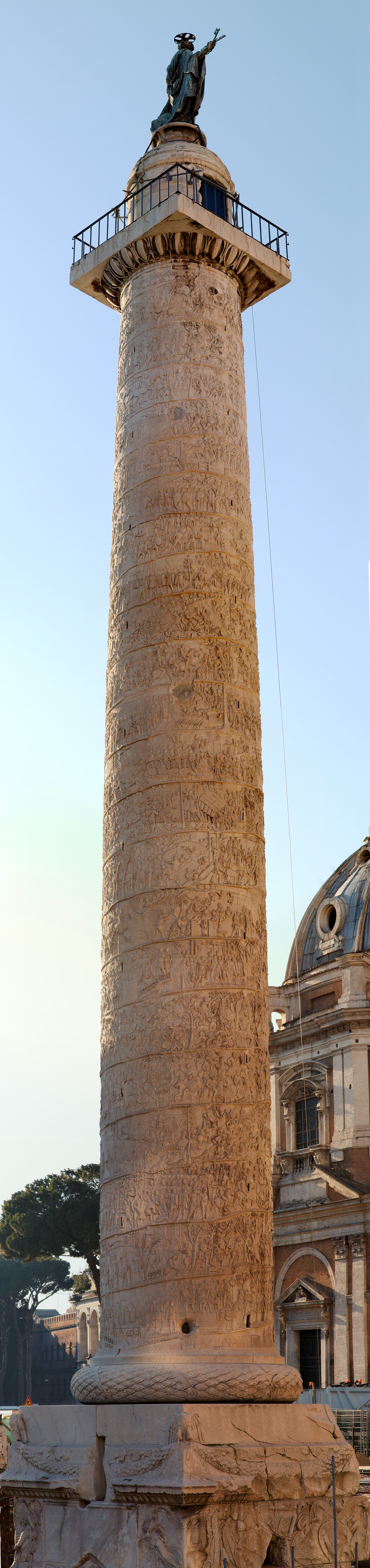
Detailed view of east side (high resolution)

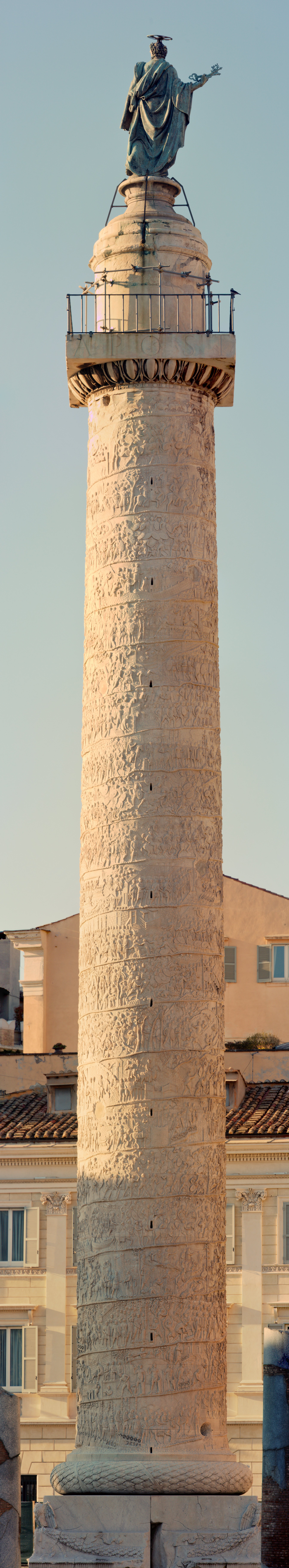
Detailed view of southeast side (high resolution)

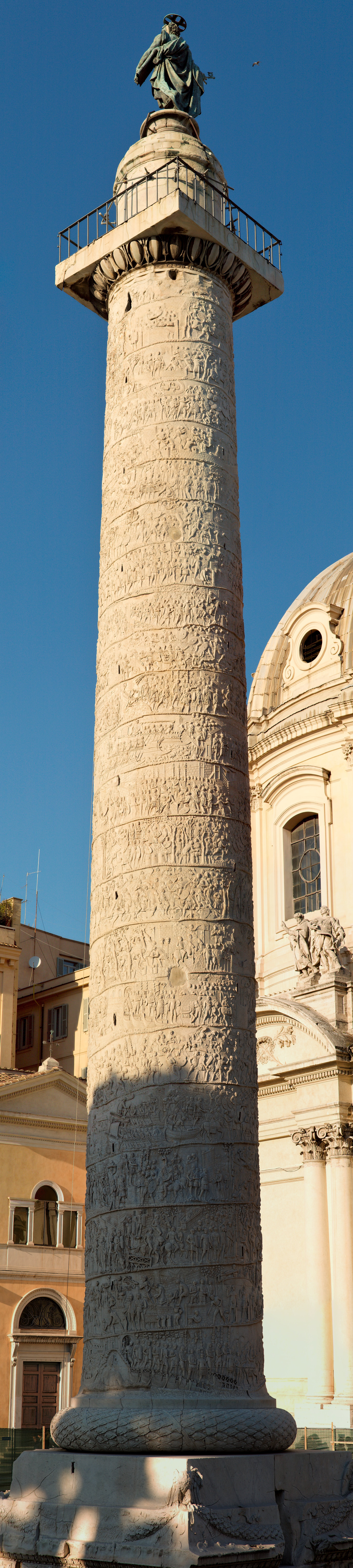
Detailed view of south-southwest side (high resolution)

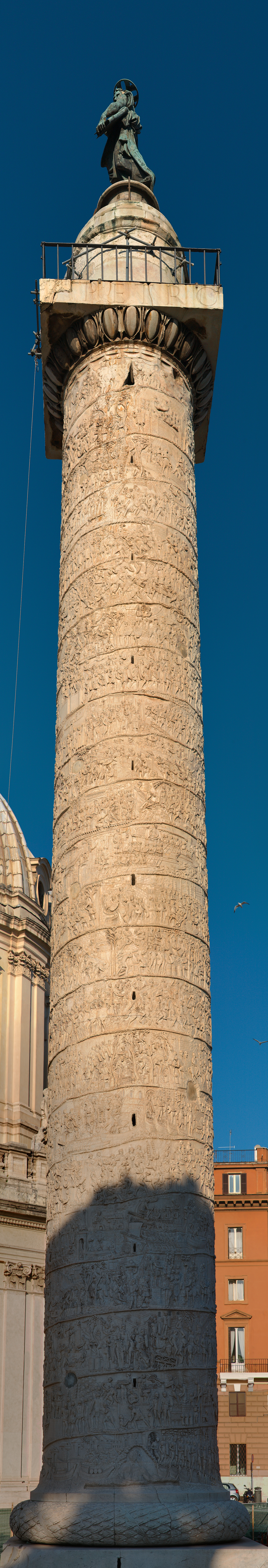
Detailed view of west-southwest side (high resolution)

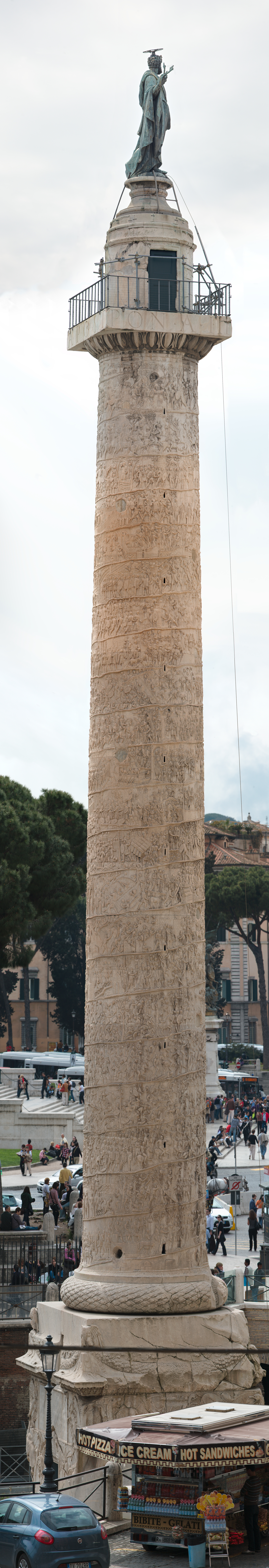
Detailed view of west side (high resolution)

== Influence ==
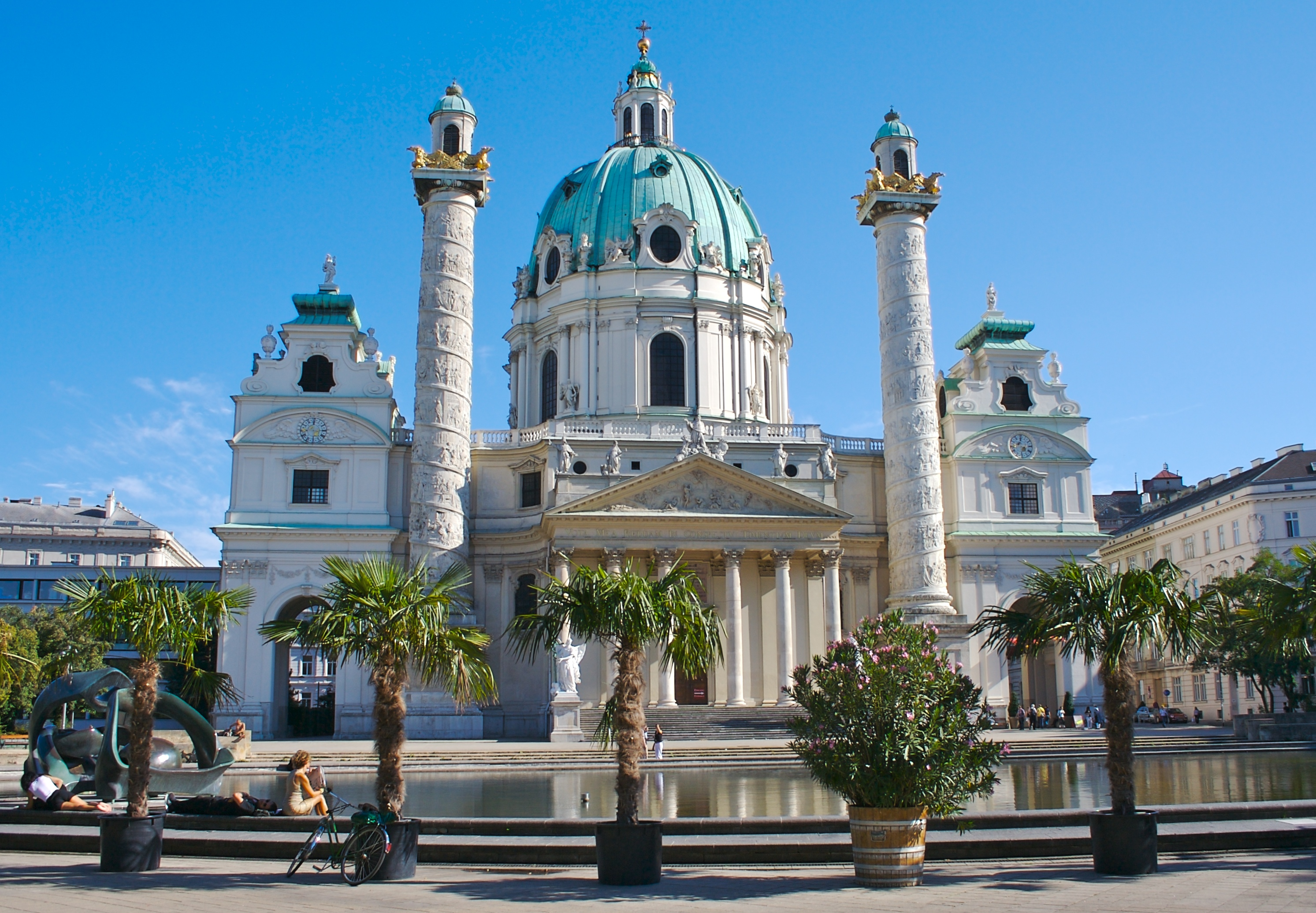
Front side of the Karlskirche in Vienna, flanked by two columns styled after the Roman archetype

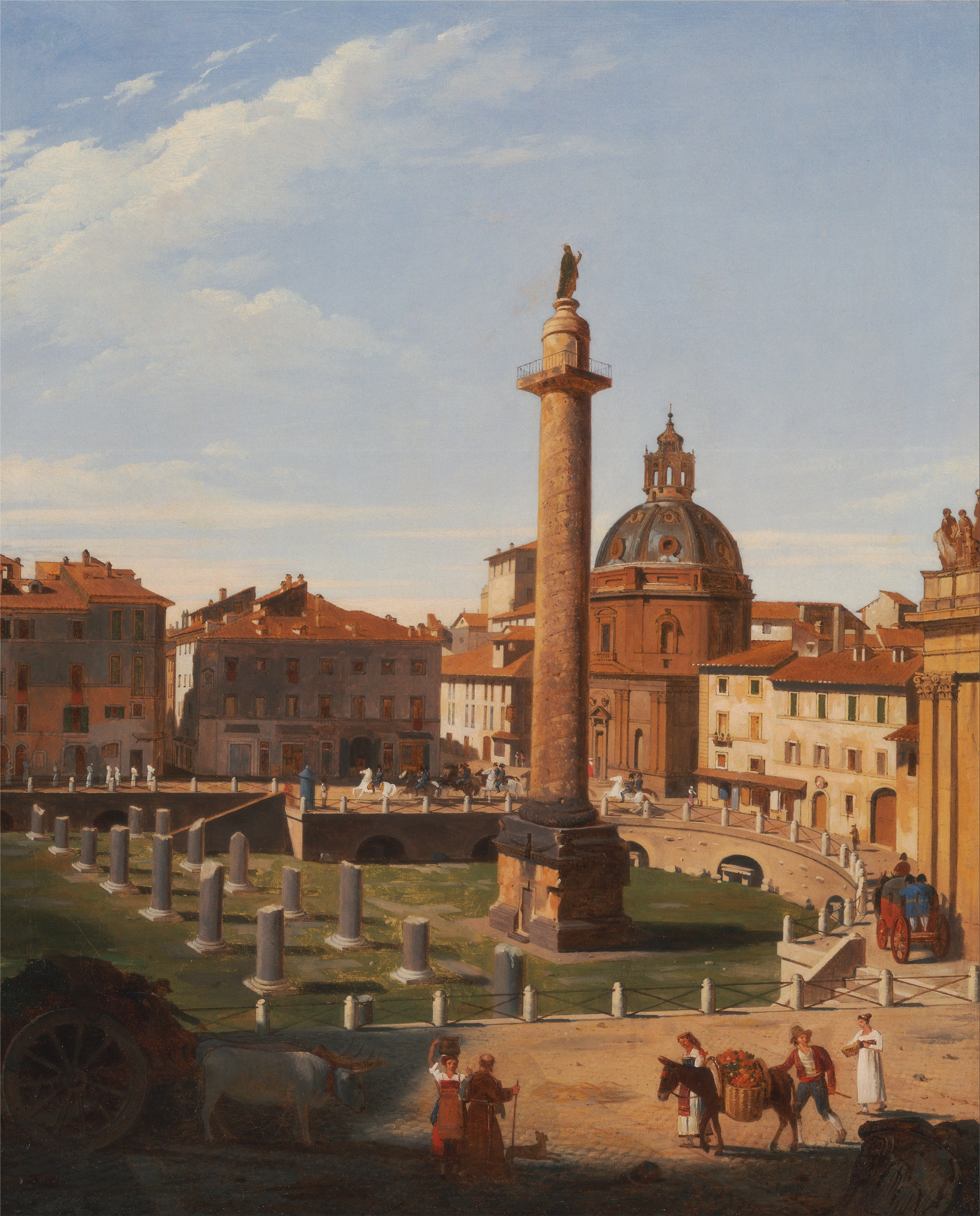
A View of Trajan's Forum, Rome by Charles Lock Eastlake, 1821

Rome

- Column of Antoninus Pius
- Column of Marcus Aurelius

Constantinople

- Column of Arcadius
- Column of Theodosius
- Column of Constantine

Medieval

- Bernward Column in Hildesheim Cathedral, Germany

Modern

- Column of the Grande Armée
- Astoria Column in Astoria, Oregon
- Colonne Vendôme in Paris
- Congress Column in Brussels
- Karlskirche in Vienna
- Marian and Holy Trinity columns, religious monuments built in honour of the Virgin Mary
- Washington Monument (Baltimore)
- Monument to the Great Fire of London
- Nelson's Column

== See also ==
- Column of Marcus Aurelius – Ancient Roman victory column, a landmark of Rome, Italy
- Sequential art
- Solomonic column
- Tropaeum Traiani

== Sources ==
- Beckmann, Martin (2002), "The 'Columnae Coc(h)lides' of Trajan and Marcus Aurelius", Phoenix, 56 (3/4): 348–357, doi:10.2307/1192605, JSTOR 1192605
- Bennett, Julian (1997), Trajan. Optimus Princeps, Routledge, ISBN 978-0-415-16524-2
- Cichorius, Conrad (1896), Die Reliefs der Traianssäule. Erster Tafelband: "Die Reliefs des Ersten Dakischen Krieges", Tafeln 1–57, Berlin: Georg Reimer
- Cichorius, Conrad (1900), Die Reliefs der Traianssäule. Zweiter Tafelband: "Die Reliefs des Zweiten Dakischen Krieges", Tafeln 58–113, Berlin: Georg Reimer
- Davies, Penelope J. E. (1997), "The Politics of Perpetuation: Trajan's Column and the Art of Commemoration", American Journal of Archaeology, 101 (1), Archaeological Institute of America: 41–65, doi:10.2307/506249, JSTOR 506249, S2CID 155391228
- Förtsch, Reinhard (2007), Die Trajanssäule, archived from the original on 2010-04-16
- Fox, Andrew (2019), "Trajanic Trees: The Dacian Forest on Trajan's Column", Papers of the British School at Rome, 87: 47–69, doi:10.1017/S006824621800034X, S2CID 194943446
- Jones, Mark Wilson (1993), "One Hundred Feet and a Spiral Stair: The Problem of Designing Trajan's Column", Journal of Roman Archaeology, 6: 23–38, doi:10.1017/S1047759400011454, S2CID 250348951
- Jones, Mark Wilson (2000), Principles of Roman Architecture, Yale University Press, ISBN 0-300-08138-3
- Lancaster, Lynne (1999), "Building Trajan's Column", American Journal of Archaeology, 103 (3), Archaeological Institute of America: 419–439, doi:10.2307/506969, JSTOR 506969, S2CID 192986322
- Lepper, Frank; Frere, Sheppard (1988), Trajan's Column. A New Edition of the Cichorius Plates. Introduction, Commentary and Notes, Gloucester: Alan Sutton Publishing, ISBN 0-86299-467-5
- Paoletti, John T.; Radke, Gary M. (2005), Art in Renaissance Italy (3rd ed.), Laurence King Publishing, ISBN 978-1-85669-439-1
- Platner, Samuel Ball (1929), A Topographical Dictionary of Ancient Rome, LacusCurtius
- Rossi, Lino (1971), Trajan's Column and the Dacian Wars, Cornell University Press, ISBN 0-801-40594-7
- Stoiculescu, Christian D. (1985), "Trajan's Column documentary value from a forestry viewpoint (Part 1)", Dacia, 29: 81–98

Preceded by Column of Phocas	Landmarks of Rome; Trajan's Column	Succeeded by Five-Columns Monument
