= Apollodorus of Damascus =

2nd century Syrian Roman architect and engineer

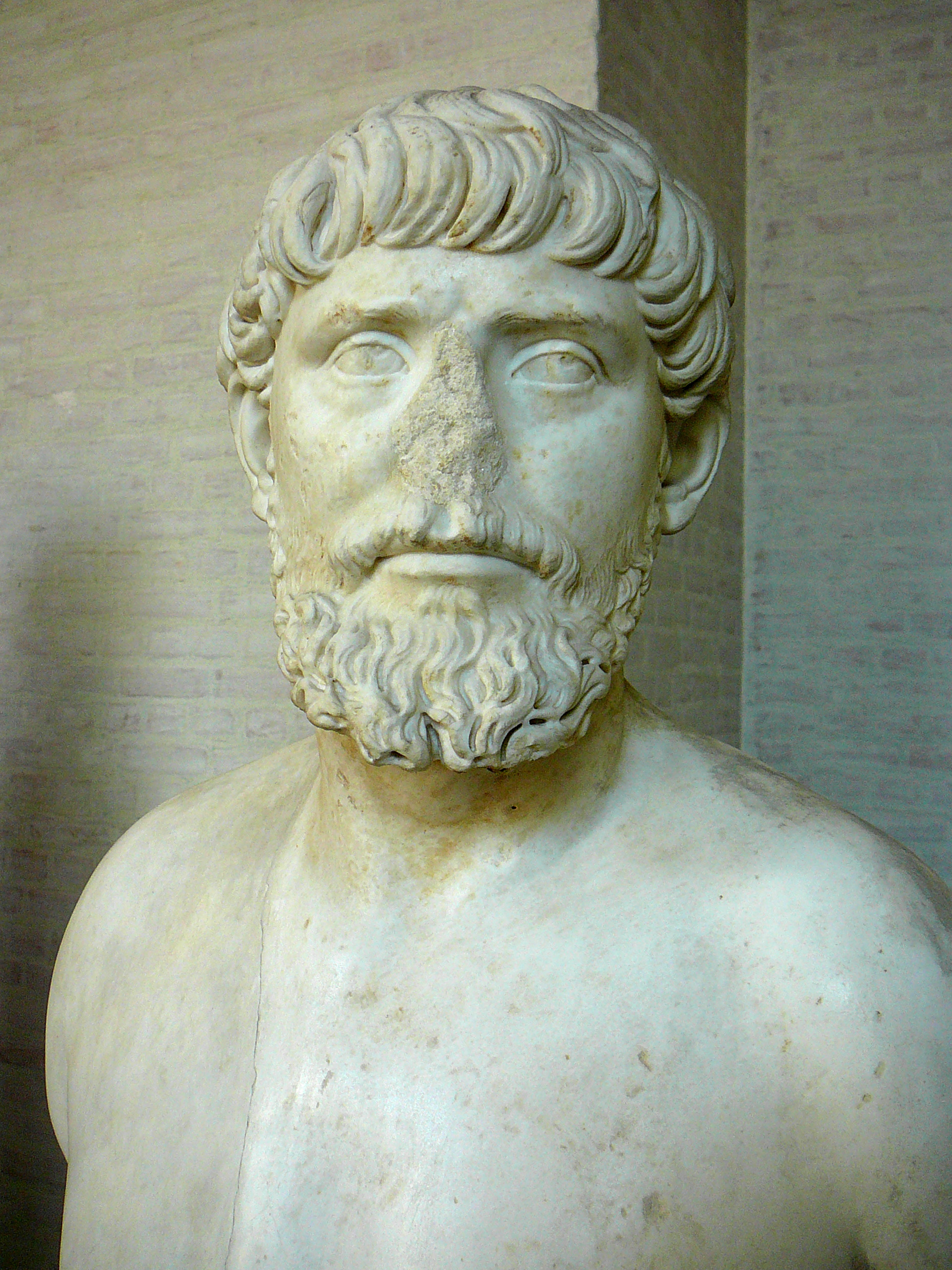
- Apollodorus of Damascus, bust from 130/140 AD in the Glyptothek
- Born: Damascus, Roman Syria, Roman Empire
- Occupation: Architect
- Buildings: Basilica Ulpia, Trajan's Forum, Temple of Trajan, The Pantheon

Apollodorus of Damascus (Latin: Apollodorus Damascenus, Ancient Greek: Ἀπολλόδωρος ὁ Δαμασκηνός) was an architect and engineer from Roman Syria, who flourished during the 2nd century AD. As an architect he authored several technical treatises, and his massive architectural output gained him immense popularity during his time. He is one of the few architects whose name survives from antiquity, and is credited with introducing several Eastern innovations to the Roman Imperial style, such as making the dome a standard. He is also known as Apollodorus Mechanicus.

== Early life ==
Apollodorus was born in Damascus, Roman Syria. Modern sources refer to him as Arab, or specifically Nabatean Arab, Hellenized Nabatean, or as Greek. Neither Cassius Dio nor Procopius, scholars and historians of antiquity, mention his origins when writing of him. Some scholars state the name Apollodorus to be a Hellenized form of Nabataean "Abdal" or "Abodat". It is noted that Trajan may have first met the architect in Syria, where Apollodorus began his career and maintained his artistic ties. Furthermore, the stylistic and grammatical weakness of his inscriptions in Greek language suggest that it was not his mother tongue.

Little is known of his early life, but he started his career as a military engineer before meeting future emperor Trajan in Damascus, then being summoned to Rome by him when he was a consul in 91 AD, shortly after Apollodorus's twentieth birthday, and later accompanying him during the Second Dacian War in 105 AD.

== Architectural works ==
Apollodorus designed many architectural works under roman emperor Trajan.

In Rome he designed and oversaw the construction of:

- Trajan's Forum and Markets
- Temple of Trajan
- Trajan's Column (the first monument of its kind)

Outside the capital, Apollodorus designed the:

- Trajan's Bridge across the Danube
- Alconétar Bridge over the Tagus in Spain
- triumphal arch of Trajan at Benevento
- Arch of Trajan at Ancona.
- Trajan's Trophy near Adamclisi, Romania

He is the author of Siege Engines (Πολιορκητικά, Poliorcetica), dedicated to an unnamed emperor, likely Trajan.

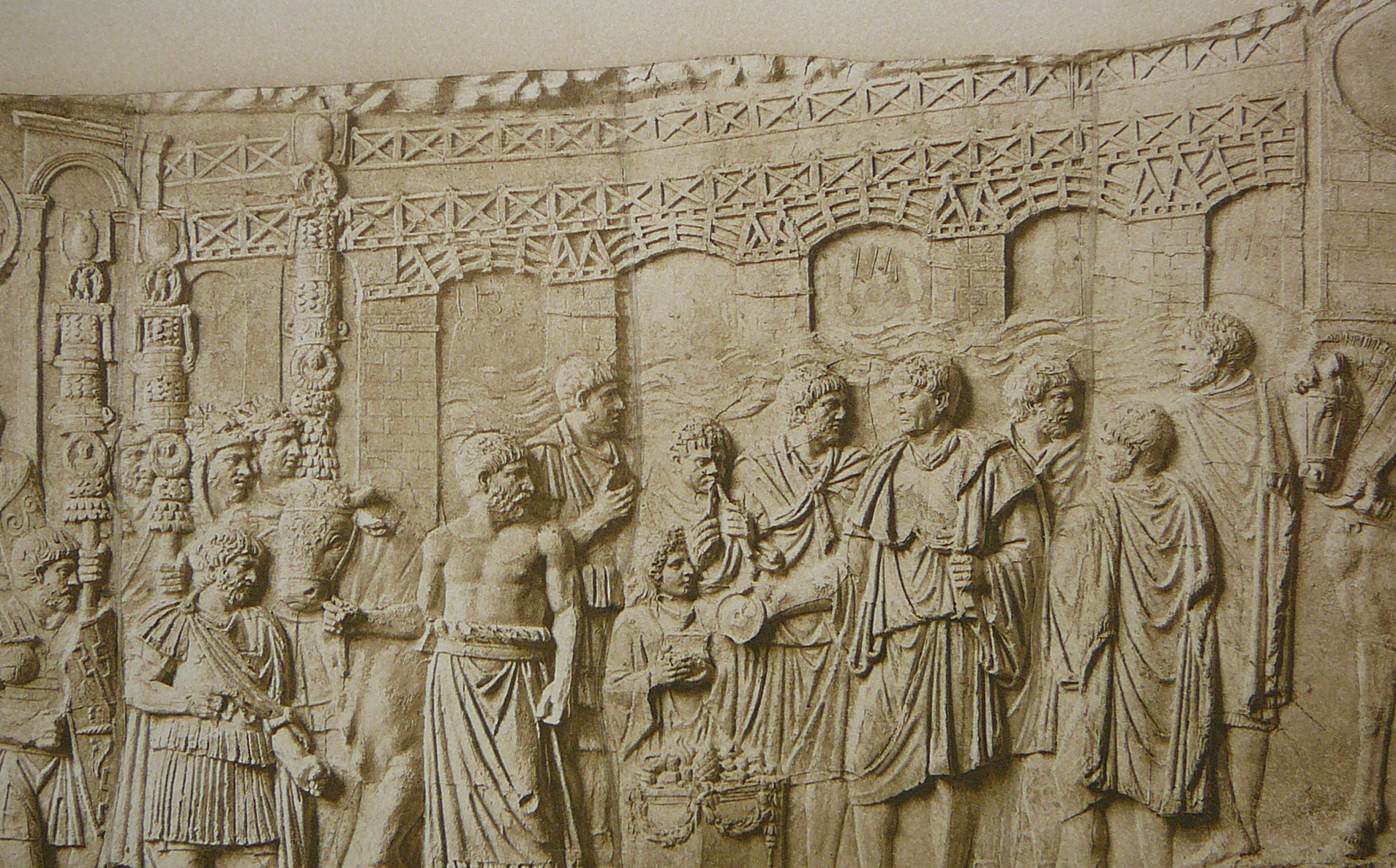
The monumental Danube Bridge of Apollodorus. Apollodorus himself stands in the foreground behind the sacrificing emperor.

The director of the Italian Institute of Culture in Damascus, Fiorella Festa Farina, described the technical prowess of Apollodorus as stemming from his cultural roots and the architectural tradition of Syria; and that he owed his particular mastery to Nabataean culture filtered through Greek modes of thought. He was known for his practical and robust designs. It was likely due to his influence that domes became a standard element in Roman architecture.

== Death ==
Cassius Dio reports that Apollodorus offended Hadrian by dismissing and ridiculing the emperor's forays into architecture, which led to his banishment and death. According to the historian Jona Lendering, modern scholarship views the anecdote as unlikely to have occurred, due to Hadrian's preoccupation with far greater threats to his power early in his reign, and that the criticism Apollodorus proffered was acted upon.

== See also ==
- Trajan's Market
- Trajan's Column
- Temple of Trajan
- Trajan's Bridge
- Trajan's Forum
- Pantheon, Rome
