= Trajan's Market =

Ancient Roman city architecture, a landmark of Rome, Italy

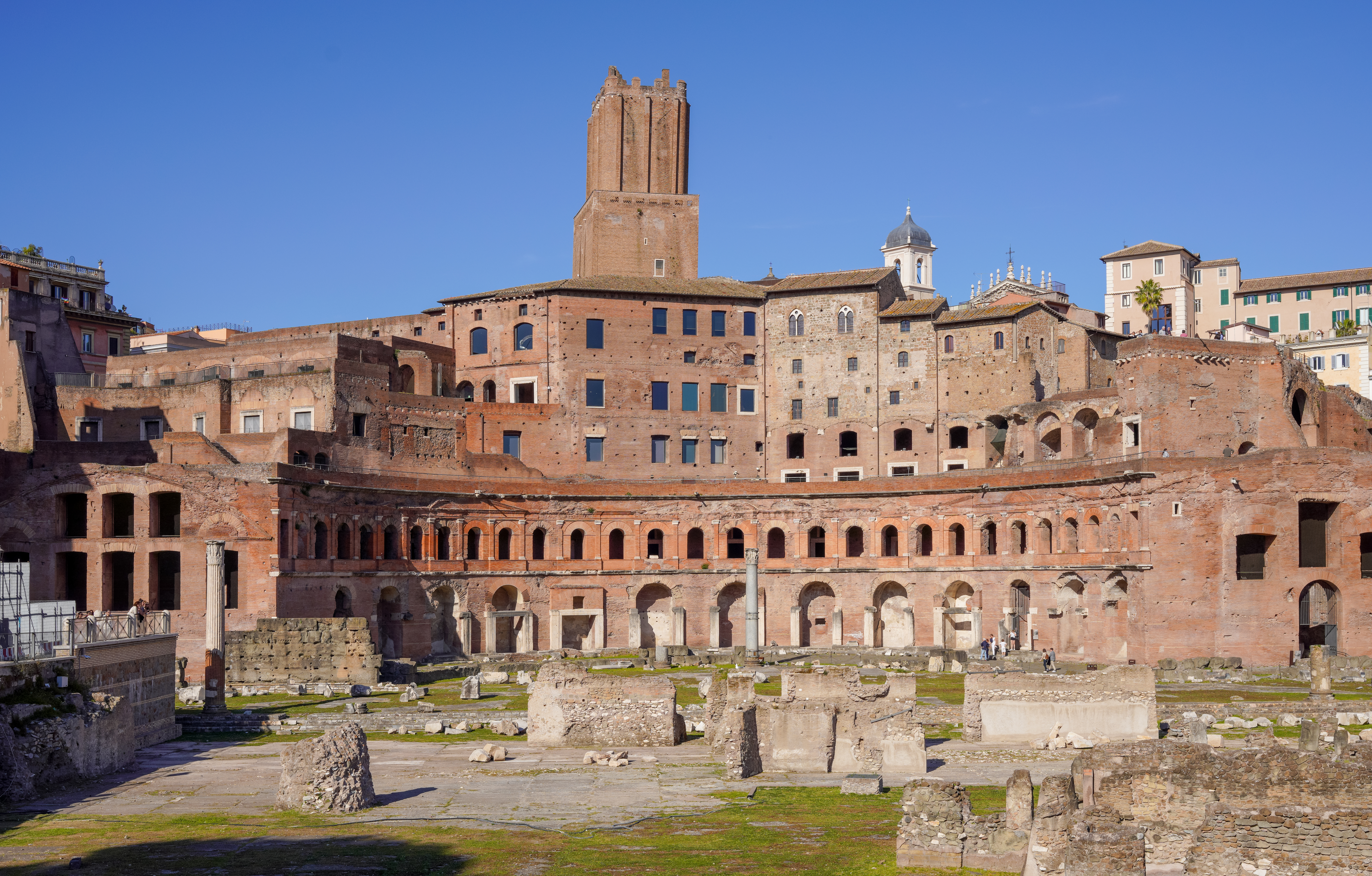
- Trajan's Market, 2022

- Location within Rome
- Interactive map of Trajan's Market
- 41°53′44″N 12°29′10″E
- Location: Trajan's Forum

History
- Built: AD 100~110
- Built by: Apollodorus of Damascus

Trajan's Market (Latin: Mercatus Traiani; Italian: Mercati di Traiano) is a large complex of ruins in the city of Rome, Italy, located on the Via dei Fori Imperiali, at the opposite end to the Colosseum. The surviving buildings and structures, built as an integral part of Trajan's Forum and nestled against the excavated flank of the Quirinal Hill, present a living model of life in the Roman capital and a glimpse at the restoration in the city, which reveals new treasures and insights about ancient Roman architecture.

Thought to be the world's oldest shopping mall, the arcades in Trajan's Market are now believed by many to be administrative offices for Emperor Trajan. The shops and apartments were built in a multi-level structure and it is still possible to visit several of the levels. Highlights include delicate marble floors and the remains of a library.

== Construction ==
Trajan's Market was probably built between 100–110 AD by Apollodorus of Damascus, an architect who always followed Trajan in his adventures and to whom Trajan entrusted the planning of his Forum. It was inaugurated in 113 AD. During the Middle Ages the complex was transformed by adding floor levels, still visible today, and defensive elements such as the Torre delle Milizie, the "militia tower" built in 1300. A convent, which was built in this area in the 16th century was acquired by the state in 1885 and became the Goffredo Mameli barracks. This was demolished at the beginning of the twentieth century to restore Trajan's Markets.

== Museo dei Fori Imperiali ==
The Museum of the Imperial Fora (Italian: Museo dei Fori Imperiali), which opened in 2007, houses a wealth of artifacts from all of ancient Rome's forums. The modern entrances to Trajan's Market are at Via Quattro Novembre, 94, and Piazza Madonna di Loreto. Immediately, the visitor enters into a shopping area, disposed on two different sides, where free wheat was once distributed to the people of Rome.

At the end of this hall, a large balcony offers a view of the markets, Trajan's Forum, and the Vittoriano. This is actually a part of the Via Biberatica (from the Latin bibo, bibere meaning "to drink"; the street was the location for several of the Roman taverns and grocers' shops in the area). The road cuts through Trajan's Market.

On the lower part there are also two large halls, probably used for auditions or concerts. A shop housed in the Market is known as a taberna. The giant exedra formed by the market structure was originally mirrored by a matching exedral boundary space on the south flank of Trajan's Forum.

The grand hall of the market is roofed by a concrete vault raised on piers, both covering and allowing air and light into the central space. The market itself is constructed primarily out of brick and concrete.

== Gallery ==
Trajan's Market

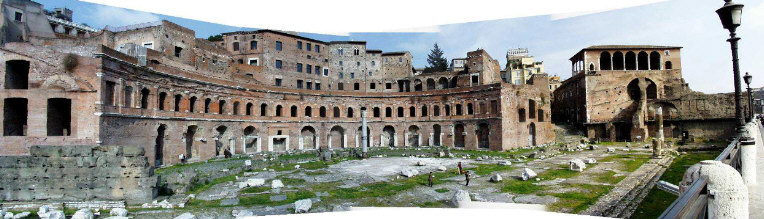
Panoramic view of Trajan's Market in 2000

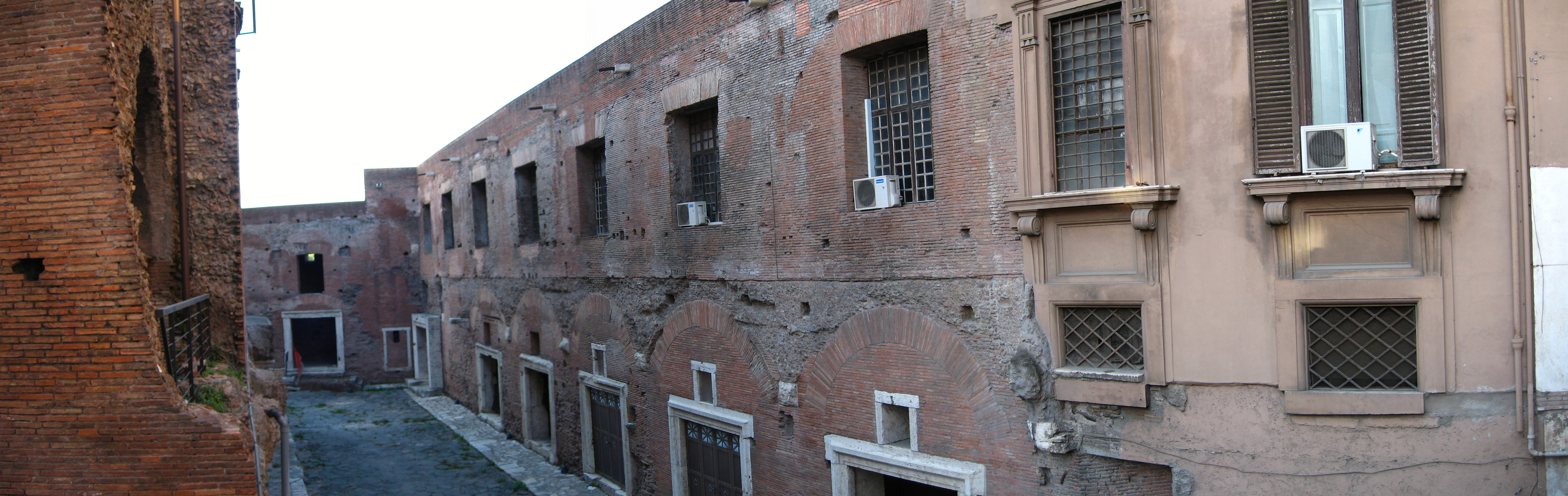
Trajan's Market and Via Biberatica (2006)

== See also ==
- Mausoleum of Augustus – Ancient Roman tomb in Rome, Italy
- Seven hills of Rome – Geographical heart of Rome, Italy, within the walls of the city
- Trajan's Bridge – Roman segmental arch bridge over the lower Danube
- Trajan's Wall – Eastern European fortifications made of earth

== References and sources ==
External videos
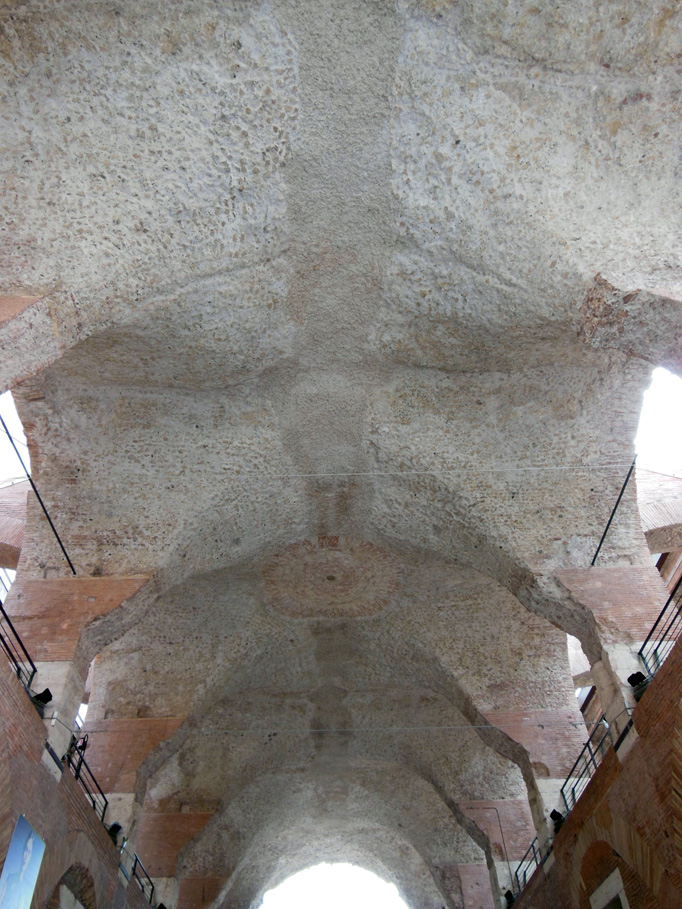
- Markets of Trajan, Smarthistory at Khan Academy, (3:54), December 4, 2014

=== Sources ===
- Bunson, Matthew (2002) [1994]. Encyclopedia of the Roman Empire. New York: Facts on File. pp. 337, 550–551. ISBN 0-8160-4562-3. OCLC 47930574.
- Honour, Hugh; Fleming, John F. (15 January 2009) [1995]. The Visual Arts: A History, Revised Edition. Canada: Pearson Education. p. 193. ISBN 978-0-205-66535-8. OCLC 700049334.
- Lancaster, Lynne (1998). "Building Trajan's Markets". American Journal of Archaeology. 102 (2): 283–308. doi:10.2307/506470. ISSN 0002-9114. JSTOR 506470. S2CID 193025548.
- Richard, Carl J. (16 April 2010). Why We're All Romans: The Roman Contribution to the Western World. Lanham, Maryland: Rowman & Littlefield. pp. 70–71, 229. ISBN 9780742567801.
- Vreeland, Frederick; Vreeland, Vanessa (24 April 2006). Key to Rome. Los Angeles: J. Paul Getty Museum. pp. 31, 33, 36. ISBN 0-89236-802-0. OCLC 62714763.
- "Il Museo dei Fori Imperiali" [The Museum of the Imperial Fora] (in Italian). Biblioteca Virtual Miguel de Cervantes.

Preceded by Porticus Aemilia	Landmarks of Rome; Trajan's Market	Succeeded by Casal Rotondo
