= Trajan's Forum =

Ancient Roman imperial forum in Rome

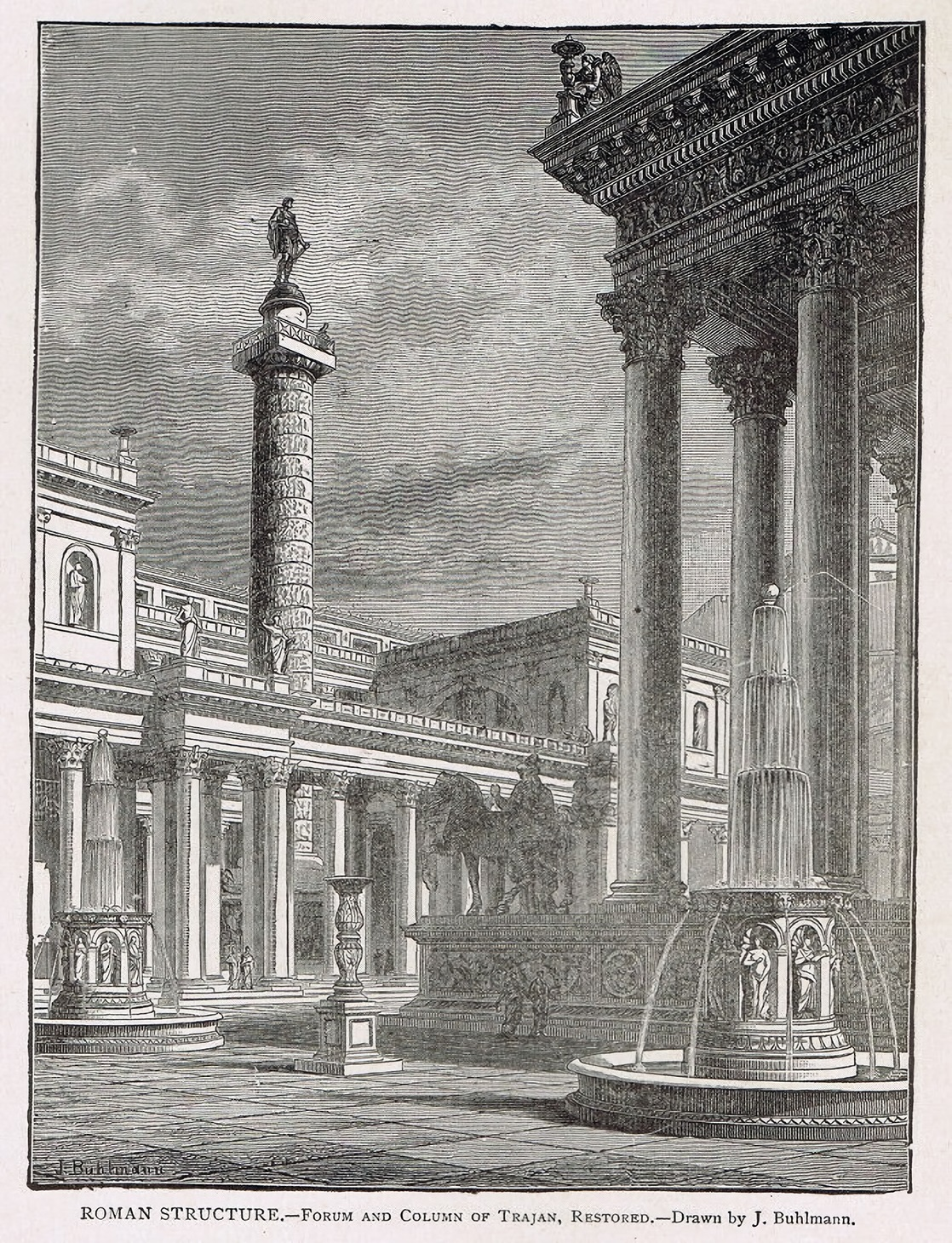
- Reconstruction view of the Trajan's Column

- Shown within Augustan Rome
- Interactive map of Trajan's Forum
- 41°53′44″N 12°29′09″E
- Type: Imperial fora
- Location: Regio VIII Forum Romanum

History
- Built: 106–112 AD
- Built by: Emperor Trajan

Trajan's Forum (Latin: Forum Traiani; Italian: Foro di Traiano) was the last of the Imperial fora to be constructed in ancient Rome. The architect Apollodorus of Damascus oversaw its construction.

== History ==
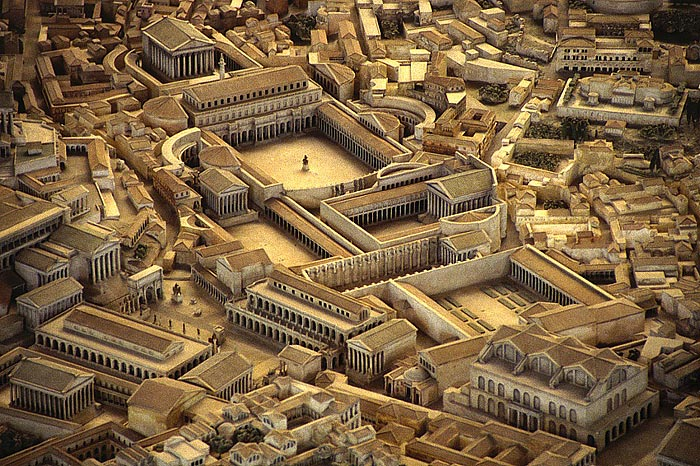
View of Trajan's Forum on Italo Gismondi's scale model of imperial Rome

This forum was built on the order of the emperor Trajan with the spoils of war from the conquest of Dacia, which ended in 106. The construction began between 105 and 107; according to the Fasti Ostienses the Forum was inaugurated in 112. Trajan's Column was erected and then inaugurated in 113.

To build this monumental complex, extensive excavations were required: workers eliminated a ridge connecting the Quirinal and Capitoline (Campidoglio) Hills. Over 300,000 cubic meters of soil and rock were excavated and dumped outside the Porta Collina.

It is possible that the excavations were initiated under Emperor Domitian, while the project of the Forum was completely attributed to the architect Apollodorus of Damascus, who also accompanied Emperor Trajan in the Dacian campaign.

During the time of the construction, several other projects took place: the construction of the Market of Trajan, the renovation of Caesar's Forum (where the Basilica Argentaria was built) and the Temple of Venus Genetrix.

== Structure ==
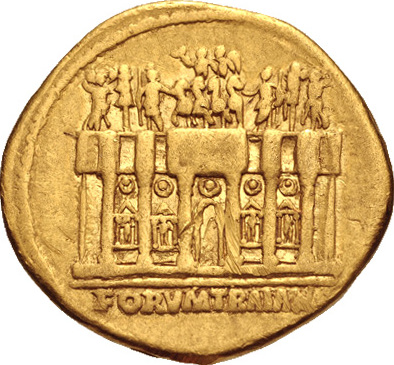
Aureus of Trajan (r. 98–117) with part of the forum on the reverse, marked: forum traiana and showing the decorative statuary

The Forum consisted of a sequence of open and enclosed spaces, beginning with the vast portico-lined piazza measuring 300 metres (980 feet) long and 185 metres (607 feet) wide, with exedrae on two sides. The main entrance was at the south end of the piazza, through a triumphal arch at the center commemorating the Dacian Wars, decorated with friezes and statues of Dacian prisoners. The arch was flanked by tall walls built from blocks of Peperino tuff clad entirely in marble, which enclosed the Forum on three sides.

The tuff walls which enclosed the piazza to the west and east featured exedrae; outside the exedrae, separated by streets, were markets of concentric shape. The three-story eastern market, known as Trajan's Market, buttressed the excavated edge of the Quirinal Hill. The open space of the Forum measured about 91 metres (299 feet) by 120 metres (390 feet), and was paved entirely in Carrara marble. Via a doorway in the far east wall of the Forum, one gained entry to an open courtyard with a portico, which communicated in turn with the adjacent Forum of Augustus.

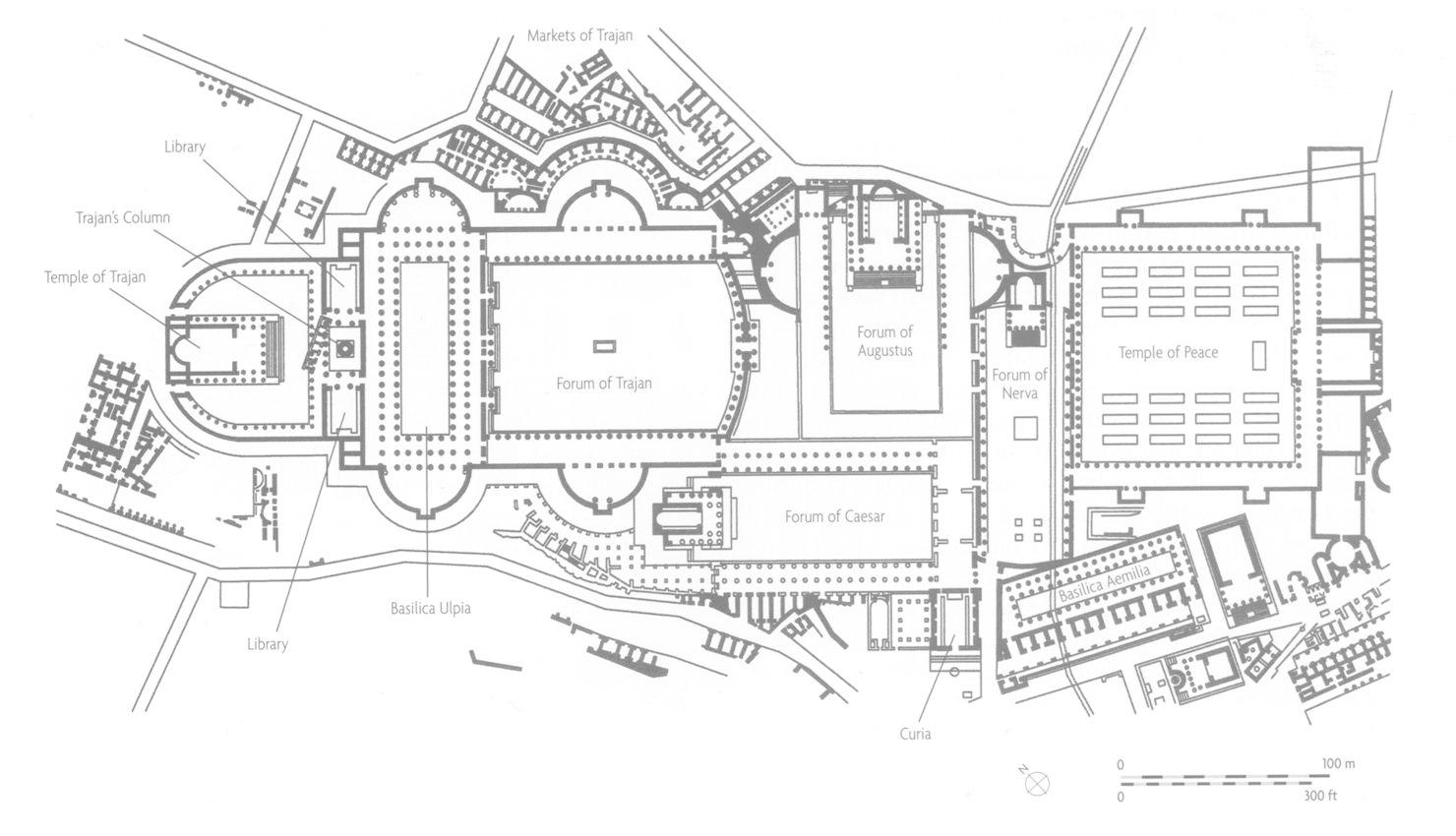
Plan of Trajan's Forum

Along the piazza's north side was the Basilica Ulpia, and north of that was a smaller piazza, with a temple dedicated to the deified Trajan on the far north side facing inwards. The position of – and very existence of – the temple dedicated to the deified Trajan is a matter of hotly contested debate among archaeologists, particularly clear in the ongoing debate between James E. Packer and Roberto Meneghini. Between the Basilica Ulpia and the terminal piazza containing the temple, were two libraries, one housing Latin documents and the other Greek documents. Between the libraries stood the 38-metre (125-foot) Trajan's Column. The libraries housed state archives including the acts of the Emperors and the edicts of the praetors.

Trajan's successor Hadrian added a philosophical school adjacent to the piazza containing the Temple of Trajan. The building consisted of three parallel halls separated by annexes and was known as the Athenaeum; it functioned variously as school, a venue for judicial proceedings, and an occasional meeting-place for the Senate.

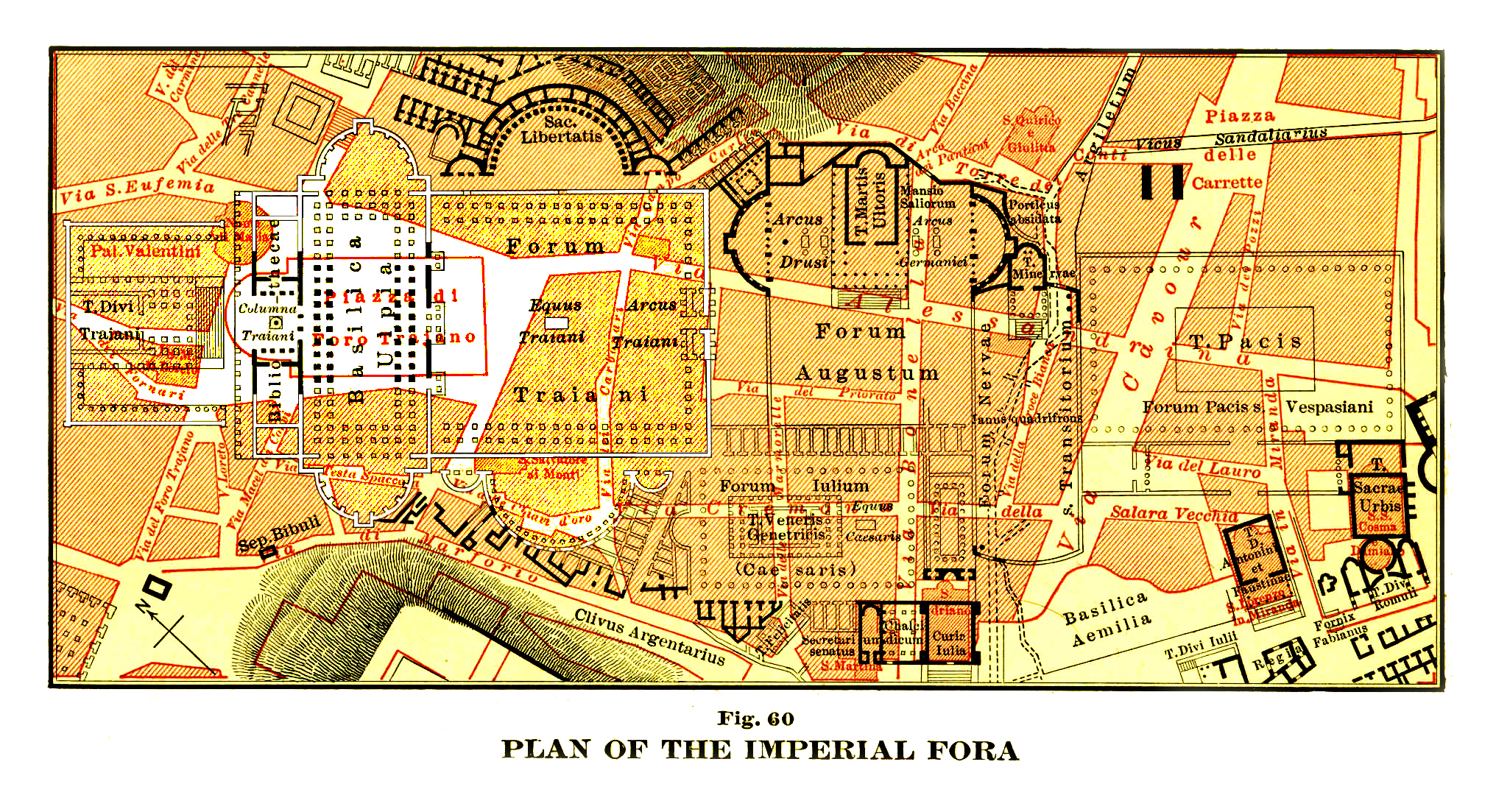
Map of the Imperial Fora showing Trajan's Forum

Constantius II, while visiting Rome in the year 357, was amazed by the huge equestrian statue of Trajan and by the surrounding buildings:

But when he [Constantius II] came to the Forum of Trajan, a construction unique under the heavens, as we believe, and admirable even in the unanimous opinion of the gods, he stood fast in amazement, turning his attention to the gigantic complex about him, beggaring description and never again to be imitated by mortal men. So renouncing all hope of attempting anything of the kind, he said he wanted to imitate only Trajan's horse, set in the middle of the atrium, and with the emperor on its back. And prince Ormisda ... standing beside him, replied with pleasing wit: "First, emperor, command the construction of a stable like this, so that the horse you wish to have made can find as appropriate a setting as that we have before our eyes."

— Ammianus Marcellinus, Histories XVI.10.15-16

External videos
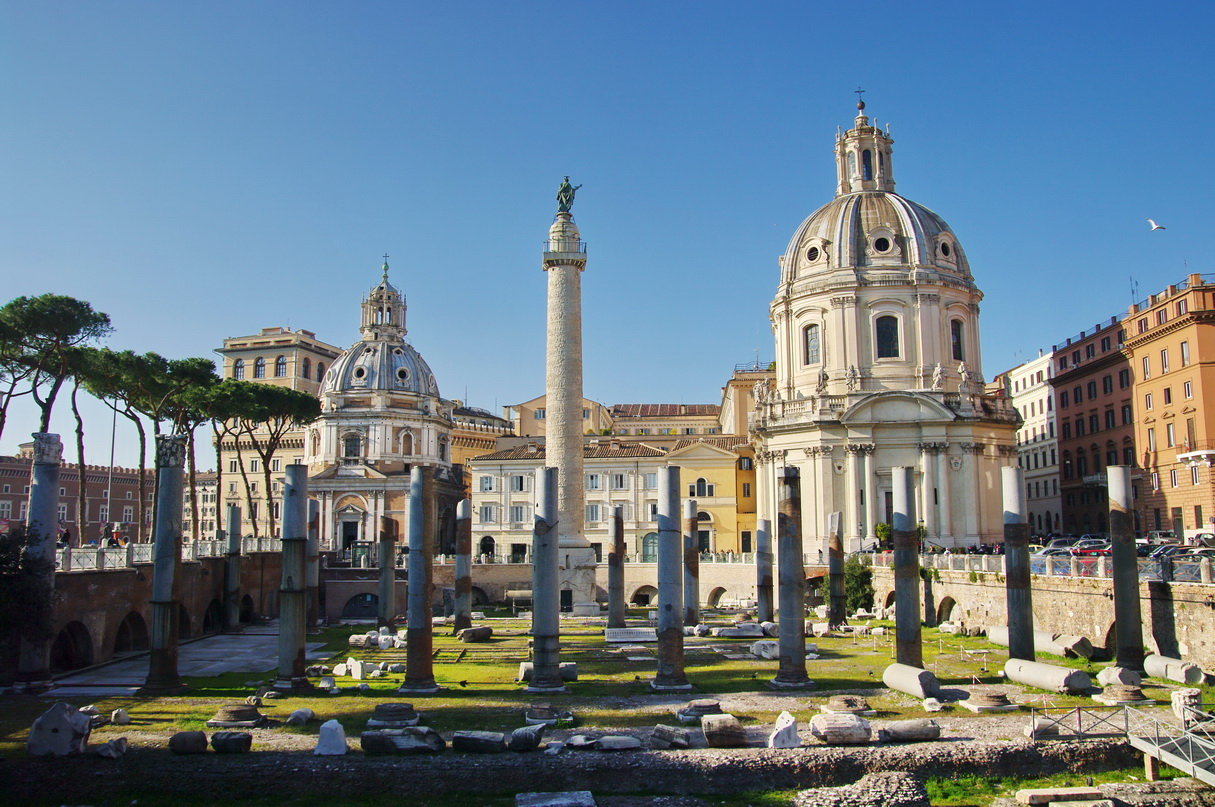
- Trajan's Forum, Smarthistory at Khan Academy (6:00), December 1, 2014

== Post-Roman history ==
In the mid-9th century, the marble cobble blocks of the piazza were systematically taken for re-use, because of the good quality of the lime. They were replaced with concrete, showing that the piazza was still in use as a public space. By the 10th century the Imperial Fora were semi-rural, with a patchwork of houses and farmland crisscrossed by roads occupying the former plaza of Trajan's Forum. In the late-16th century, the whole area of the Imperial Fora, which by then lay 3–4 meters below ground, was built up during a wave of urban expansion and the area became known as the Alessandrino district.

In 1526 the arch which formed the entrance to the Forum was demolished by the maestri di strade, Rome's Commissioners of Streets, which caused the Conservatore Francesco Cenci to submit a report to Rome's municipal government seeking redress for the destruction. Vestiges of the arch were found later in the century, including friezes which depicted scenes from the Dacian Wars, according to the descriptions of Flaminio Vacca.

In modern times only a section of the markets and the column of Trajan remain. A number of columns which historically formed the Basilica Ulpia remained on site, and have been re-erected. The construction of the Via dei Fori Imperiali in 1933 covered a number of these columns, which remain visible under the arches on which the road runs.

== See also ==
- Imperial fora
- Roman Forum
- Roman architecture
- List of ancient monuments in Rome

== Sources ==
- Packer, James (1997). Trajan's Forum: A Study of the Monuments. University of California Press.

Preceded by Forum of Vespasian	Landmarks of Rome; Trajan's Forum	Succeeded by Forum Boarium
