= Roman Egypt =

Roman province that encompassed most of modern-day Egypt

Province of Egypt Provincia Aegypti (Latin) Ἐπαρχία Αἰγύπτου (Koine Greek)
- Province of the Roman Empire
- 30 BC – 646 AD Under Palmyrene rule; 270–273 Sasanian occupation; 619–628
- Egypt in AD 125
- Capital: Alexandria
- Population
  - 1st century AD: 4 to 8 million
- Government
  - Type: Monarchy
- Prefect (Note: Styled as prefectus augustalis (augustal prefect) after 381, and then dux et praefectus augustalis (duke and augustal prefect) after 539.)
  - 30–26 BC: Cornelius Gallus
  - 642: Theodore
- Historical era: Classical antiquity Late antiquity
  - Conquest of Ptolemaic Kingdom: 30 BC
  - Formation of the Diocese: 381
  - Muslim conquest: 639–646 AD
Preceded by	Succeeded by
Ptolemaic Kingdom	Sasanian Egypt; Rashidun Caliphate
- Today part of: Egypt

During the era of the Roman Empire, most of modern-day Egypt, except for the Sinai, was ruled as the imperial province (Note: Latin: Prōvincia Ægyptī, IPA: [proːˈwɪŋki.a ae̯ˈɡʏptiː]; Koine Greek: Ἐπαρχία Αἰγύπτου, romanized: Eparchía Aigýptou, IPA: [eparˈkʰi.a ɛˈɡyptu].) of Aegyptus, (Note: Latin: Ægyptus, IPA: [ae̯ˈɡʏptʊs]; Koine Greek: Αἴγυπτος, romanized: Aígyptos, IPA: [ˈɛɡyptos].) from the time it was conquered by Roman forces in 30 BC, to AD 642. The last few centuries of this period has been called late antique Egypt. The province was bordered by Crete and Cyrenaica to the west and Judaea, later Arabia Petraea, to the East.

Egypt came to serve as a major producer of grain for the empire and had a highly developed urban economy. It was by far the wealthiest Roman province outside of Italy. The population of Roman Egypt is unknown, although estimates vary from 4 to 8 million. Alexandria, its capital, was the largest port and second largest city of the Roman Empire.

Three Roman legions garrisoned Egypt in the early Roman imperial period, with the garrison later reduced to two, alongside auxilia formations of the Roman army. The major town of each nome (administrative region) was known as a metropolis (Note: Koine Greek: μητρόπολις, romanized: mētropolis, lit. 'mother city') and granted additional privileges. The inhabitants of Roman Egypt were divided by social class along ethnic and cultural lines. Most inhabitants were peasant farmers, who lived in rural villages and spoke the Egyptian language (which evolved from the Demotic Egyptian of the Late and Ptolemaic periods to Coptic under Roman rule). In each metropolis, the citizens spoke Koine Greek and followed a Hellenistic culture. However, there was considerable social mobility, increasing urbanization, and both the rural and urban population were involved in trade and had high literacy rates. In AD 212, the Constitutio Antoniniana gave Roman citizenship to all free Egyptians.

The Antonine Plague struck in the late 2nd century, but Roman Egypt recovered by the 3rd century. Having escaped much of the Crisis of the Third Century, Roman Egypt fell under the control of the breakaway Palmyrene Empire after an invasion of Egypt by Zenobia in 269. The emperor Aurelian (r. 270–275) successfully besieged Alexandria and recovered Egypt. The usurpers Domitius Domitianus and Achilleus took control of the province in opposition to emperor Diocletian (r. 284–305), who recovered it in 297–298. Diocletian then introduced administrative and economic reforms. These coincided with the Christianization of the Roman Empire, especially the growth of Christianity in Egypt. After Constantine the Great gained control of Egypt in AD 324, the emperors promoted Christianity. The Coptic language, derived from earlier forms of Egyptian, emerged among the Christians of Roman Egypt.

Under Diocletian the frontier was moved downriver to the First Cataract of the Nile at Syene (Aswan), withdrawing from the Dodekaschoinos region. This southern frontier was largely peaceful for many centuries, likely garrisoned by limitanei of the late Roman army. Regular units also served in Egypt, including Scythians known to have been stationed in the Thebaid by Justinian the Great (r. 527–565). Constantine introduced the gold solidus coin, which stabilized the economy. The trend towards private ownership of land became more pronounced in the 5th century and peaked in the 6th century, with large estates built up from many individual plots. Some large estates were owned by Christian churches, and smaller land-holders included those who were themselves both tenant farmers on larger estates and landlords of tenant-farmers working their own land. The First Plague Pandemic arrived in the Mediterranean Basin with the emergence of the Justinianic Plague at Pelusium in Roman Egypt in 541.

Egypt was conquered by the Sasanian Empire in 618, who ruled the territory for a decade, but it was returned to the Eastern Roman Empire by the defection of the governor in 628. Egypt ceased to be a part of the Roman Empire in 642, when it became part of the Rashidun Caliphate following the Muslim conquest of Egypt.

== Formation ==
The Ptolemaic Kingdom (r. 305–30 BC, the Thirty-first Dynasty) had ruled Egypt since the Wars of Alexander the Great that overthrew Achaemenid Egypt. The Ptolemaic pharaoh Cleopatra VII sided with Julius Caesar during Caesar's Civil War (49–45 BC) and Caesar's subsequent Roman dictatorship. After Caesar's assassination in 44 BC, Cleopatra aligned Egypt with Mark Antony, the Roman triumvir who controlled the eastern Mediterranean. In the last war of the Roman Republic (32–30 BC), Antony (with Cleopatra's support) fought against Octavian. The decisive naval Battle of Actium was won by Octavian, who then invaded Egypt. In 30 August BC, following the Battle of Alexandria the defeated Antony and Cleopatra killed themselves. The Ptolemaic Kingdom of Egypt ceased to exist; Egypt was seized by Octavian as his personal possession.

The legal status was settled in 27 January BC, when Octavian was granted the honorific name of Augustus and Egypt became an imperial province of the newly established Roman Empire. Augustus (and succeeding Roman emperors) ruled Egypt as the Roman pharaoh. The Ptolemaic institutions were dismantled: the government administration was wholly reformed, as was the social structure, though some bureaucratic elements were maintained. The Graeco-Egyptian legal system of the Hellenistic period continued in use, but within the bounds of Roman law. The tetradrachm coinage minted at the Ptolemaic capital of Alexandria continued to be the currency of an increasingly monetized economy, but its value was made equal to the Roman denarius. Augustus introduced land reforms that enabled wider entitlement to private ownership of land (previously rare under the Ptolemaic cleruchy system of allotments under royal ownership) and the local administration reformed into a Roman liturgical system, in which land-owners were required to serve in local government. The priesthoods of the Ancient Egyptian deities and Hellenistic religions of Egypt kept most of their temples and privileges, and in turn the priests also served the Roman imperial cult of the deified emperors and their families.

== Roman government in Egypt ==
As Rome overtook the Ptolemaic system in place for areas of Egypt, they made many changes. The effect of the Roman conquest was at first to strengthen the position of the Greeks and of Hellenism against Egyptian influences. Some of the previous offices and names of offices under the Hellenistic Ptolemaic rule were kept, some were changed, and some names would have remained but the function and administration would have changed.

The Romans introduced important changes in the administrative system, aimed at achieving a high level of efficiency and maximizing revenue. The duties of the prefect of Aegyptus combined responsibility for military security through command of the legions and cohorts, for the organization of finance and taxation, and for the administration of justice.

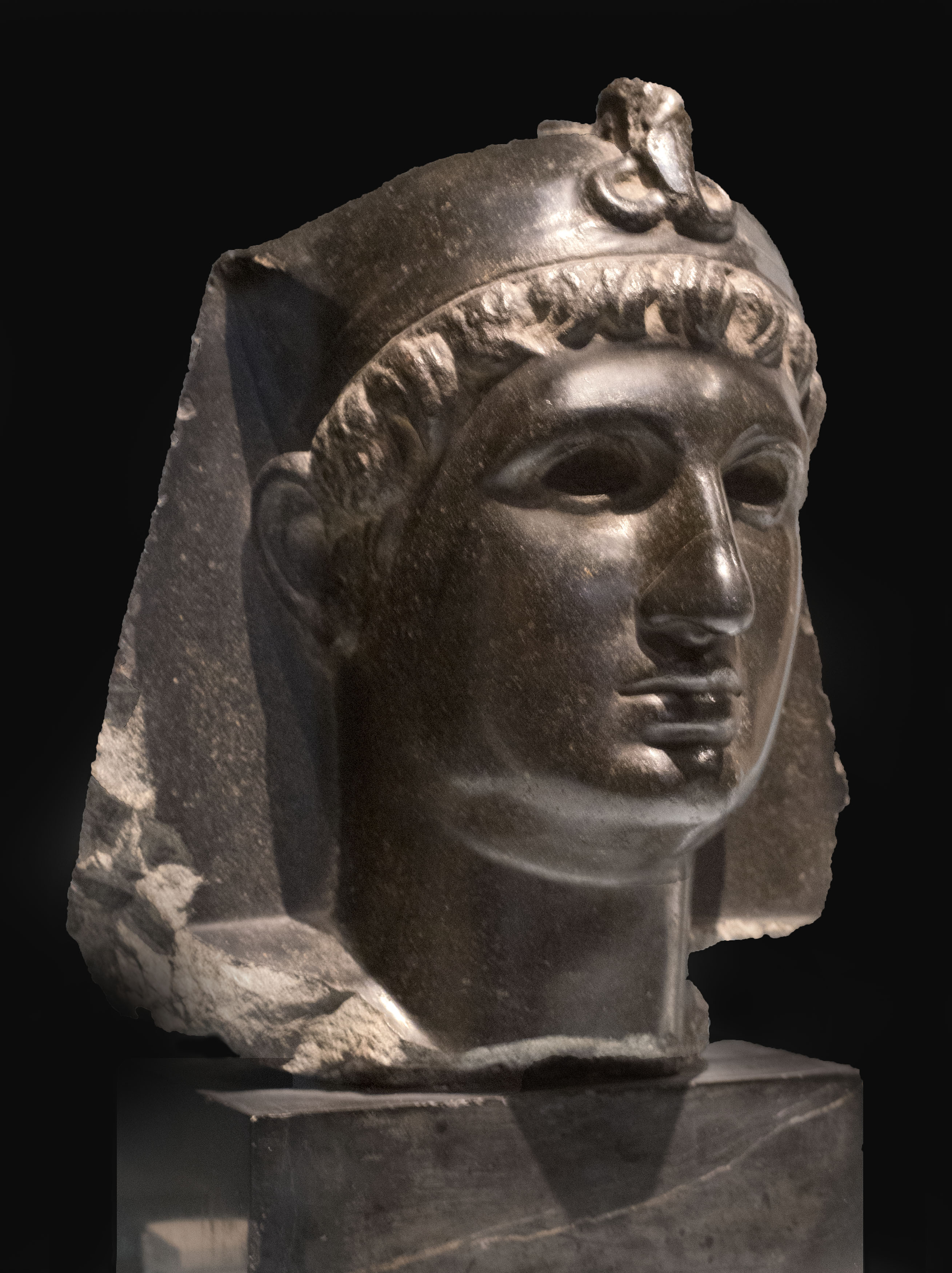
A 1st-century AD Roman emperor wearing nemes with a uraeus, as pharaoh (Louvre)

The Egyptian provinces of the Ptolemaic Kingdom remained wholly under Roman rule until the administrative reforms of the augustus Diocletian (r. 284–305). In these first three centuries of Roman Egypt, the whole country came under the central Roman control of single governor, officially called in Latin: praefectus Alexandreae et Aegypti, lit. 'prefect of Alexandria and Egypt' and more usually referred to as the Latin: praefectus Aegypti, lit. 'prefect of Egypt' or the Koine Greek: ἔπαρχος Αἰγύπτου, romanized: eparchos Aigyptou, lit. 'Eparch of Egypt'. The double title of the governor as prefect "of Alexandria and Egypt" reflects the distinctions between Upper and Lower Egypt and Alexandria, since Alexandria, outside the Nile Delta, was not within the then-prevailing traditional geographic boundaries of Egypt.

From the 1st century BC, the Roman governor of Egypt was appointed by the emperor for a multi-year term and given the rank of prefect (Latin: praefectus). Both the governor and the major officials were of equestrian rank (unlike other Roman provinces, which had governors of senatorial rank). The prefect of Egypt had more or less equivalent civil and military powers (imperium) to a proconsul, since a Roman law (a lex) granted him "proconsular imperium" (Latin: imperium ad similitudinem proconsulis). Unlike in senatorial provinces, the prefect was responsible for the collection of certain taxes and for the organization of the all-important grain shipments from Egypt (including the annona). Because of these financial responsibilities, the governor's administration had to be closely controlled and organized. The governorship of Egypt was the second-highest office available to the equestrian class on the cursus honorum (after that of the praetorian prefect (Latin: praefectus praetorio), the commander of the imperial Praetorian Guard) and one of the highest-paid, receiving an annual salary of 200,000 sesterces (a "ducenarian" post). The prefect was appointed at the emperor's discretion; officially the governors' status and responsibilities mirrored those of the augustus himself: his fairness (aequitas, 'equality') and his foresight (providentia, 'providence'). From the early 2nd century, service as the governor of Egypt was frequently the penultimate stage in the career of a praetorian prefect.

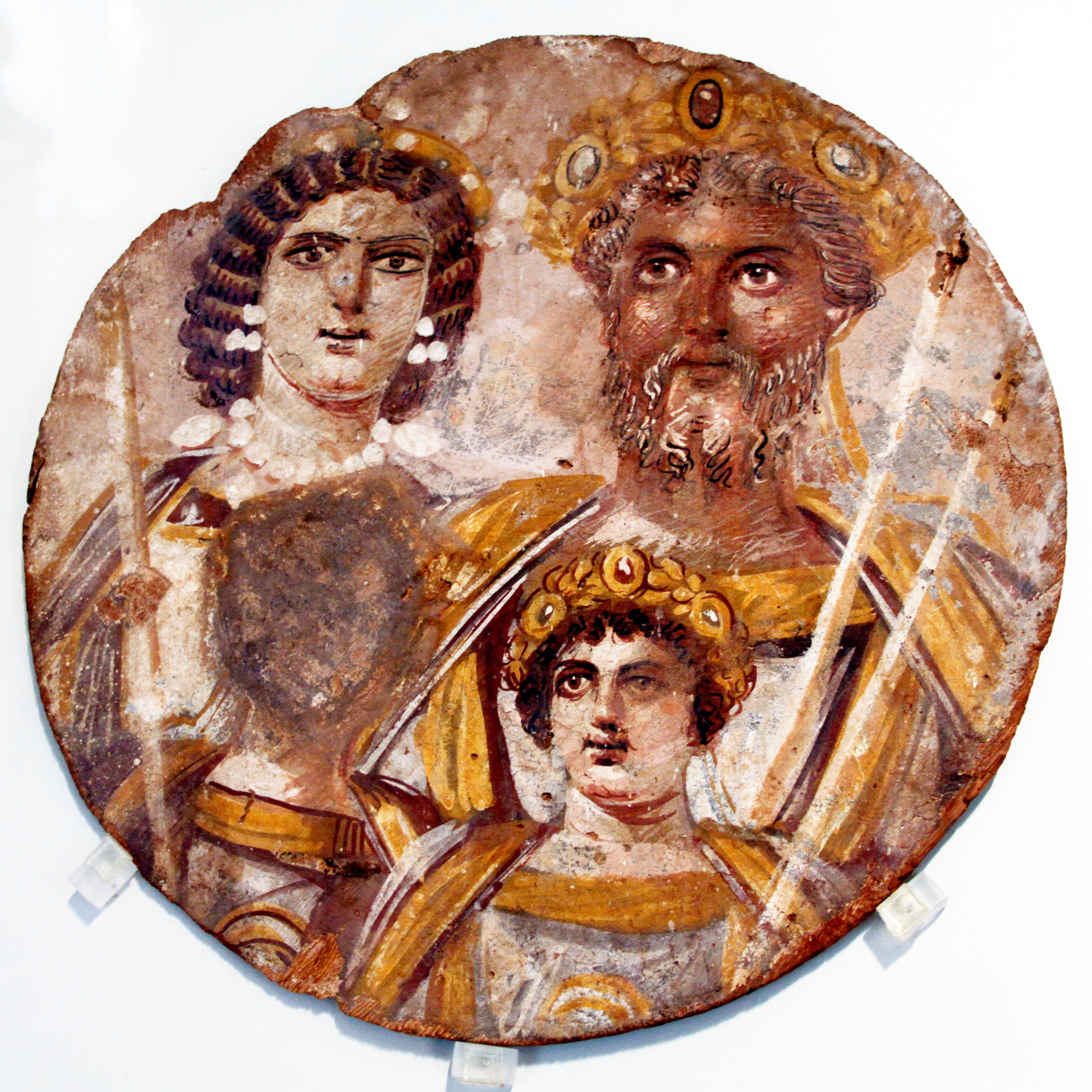
The first generations of the imperial Severan dynasty depicted on the "Severan Tondo" from Egypt (Antikensammlung Berlin)

The governor's powers as prefect, which included the rights to make edicts (ius edicendi) and, as the supreme judicial authority, to order capital punishment (ius gladii, 'right of swords'), expired as soon as his successor arrived in the provincial capital at Alexandria, who then also took up overall command of the Roman legions of the Egyptian garrison. (Initially, three legions were stationed in Egypt, with only two from the reign of Tiberius (r. 14–37 AD).) The official duties of the praefectus Aegypti are well known because enough records survive to reconstruct a mostly complete official calendar (fasti) of the governors' engagements. Yearly in Lower Egypt, and once every two years in Upper Egypt, the praefectus Aegypti held a conventus (Koine Greek: διαλογισμός, romanized: dialogismos, lit. 'dialogue'), during which legal trials were conducted and administrative officials' practices were examined, usually between January (Ianuarius) and April (Aprilis) in the Roman calendar. Evidence exists of more than 60 edicts issued by the Roman governors of Egypt.

To the government at Alexandria besides the prefect of Egypt, the Roman emperors appointed several other subordinate procurators for the province, all of equestrian rank and, at least from the reign of Commodus (r. 176–192) of similar, "ducenarian" salary bracket. The administrator of the Idios Logos, responsible for special revenues like the proceeds of bona caduca property, and the iuridicus (Koine Greek: δικαιοδότης, romanized: dikaiodotes, lit. 'giver of laws'), the senior legal official, were both imperially appointed. From the reign of Hadrian (r. 117–138), the financial powers of the prefect and the control of the Egyptian temples and priesthoods was devolved to other procurators, a dioiketes (διοικητής), the chief financial officer, and an archiereus (ἀρχιερεύς, 'archpriest'). A procurator could deputize as the prefect's representative where necessary.

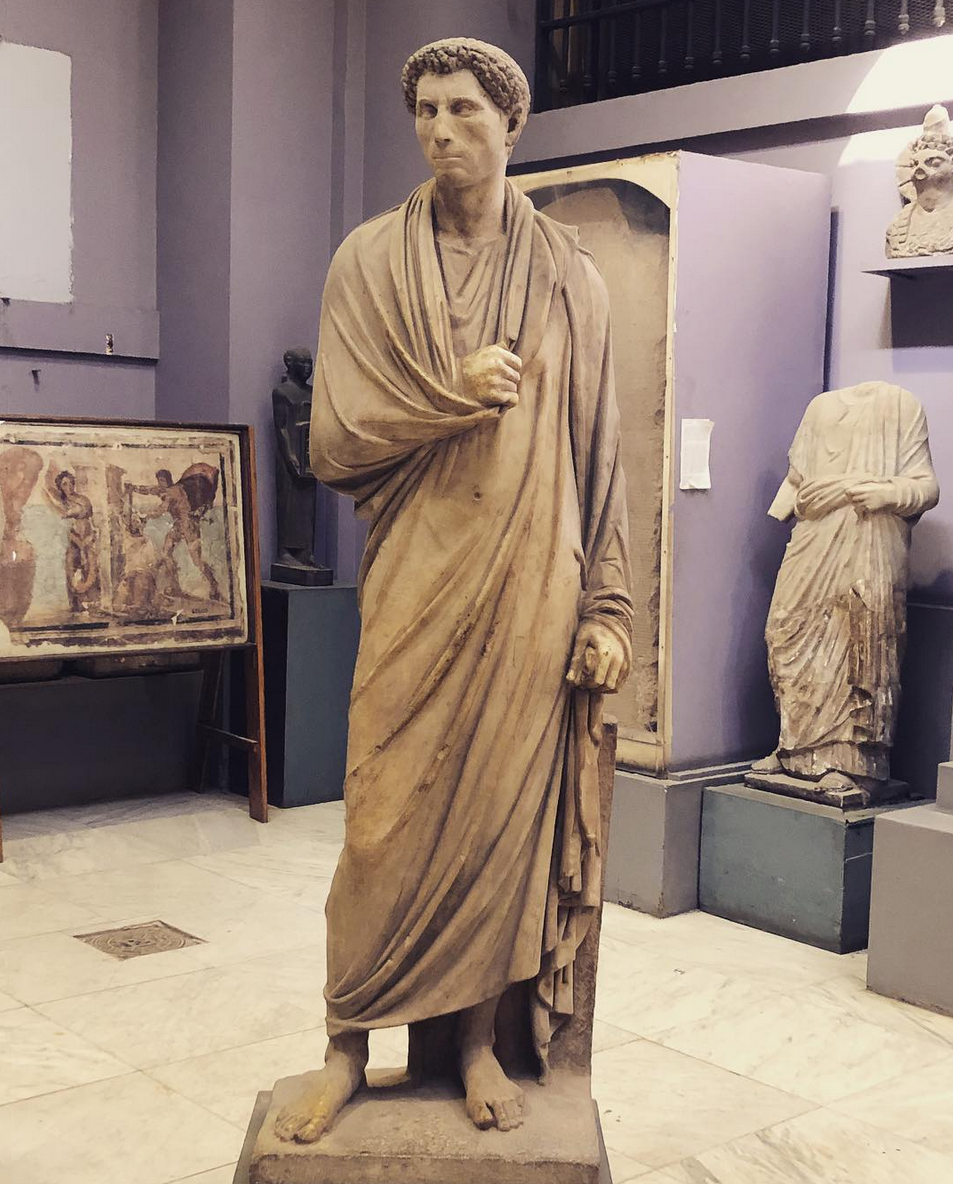
Statue of an orator, wearing a himation, from Heracleopolis Magna, in Middle Egypt (Egyptian Museum, Cairo)

Procurators were also appointed from among the freedmen (manumitted slaves) of the imperial household, including the powerful procurator usiacus, responsible for state property in the province. Other procurators were responsible for revenue farming of state monopolies (the procurator ad Mercurium), oversight of farm lands (the procurator episkepseos), of the warehouses of Alexandria (the procurator Neaspoleos), and of exports and emigration (the procurator Phari, 'procurator of the Pharos'). These roles are poorly attested, with often the only surviving information beyond the names of the offices is a few names of the incumbents. In general, the central provincial administration of Egypt is no better-known than the Roman governments of other provinces, since, unlike in the rest of Egypt, the conditions for the preservation of official papyri were very unfavourable at Alexandria.

Local government in the hinterland (Koine Greek: χώρα, romanized: khṓrā, lit. 'countryside') outside Alexandria was divided into traditional regions known as nomoi. The mētropoleis were governed by magistrates drawn from the liturgy system; these magistrates, as in other Roman cities, practised euergetism and built public buildings. To each nome the prefect appointed a strategos (Koine Greek: στρατηγός, romanized: stratēgós, lit. 'general'); the strategoi were civilian administrators, without military functions, who performed much of the government of the country in the prefect's name and were themselves drawn from the Egyptian upper classes. The strategoi in each of the mētropoleis were the senior local officials, served as intermediaries between the prefect and the villages, and were legally responsible for the administration and their own conduct while in office for several years. Each strategos was supplemented by a royal scribe (βασιλικός γραμματεύς, basilikós grammateús, 'royal secretary'). These scribes were responsible for their nome's financial affairs, including administration of all property, land, land revenues, and temples, and what remains of their record-keeping is unparalleled in the ancient world for its completeness and complexity. The royal scribes could act as proxy for the strategoi, but each reported directly to Alexandria, where dedicated financial secretaries – appointed for each individual nome – oversaw the accounts: an eklogistes and a graphon ton nomon. The eklogistes was responsible for general financial affairs while the graphon ton nomon likely dealt with matters relating to the Idios Logos. In 200/201, the emperor Septimius Severus (r. 193–211) granted each metropolis, and the city of Alexandria, a boulē (a Hellenistic town council).

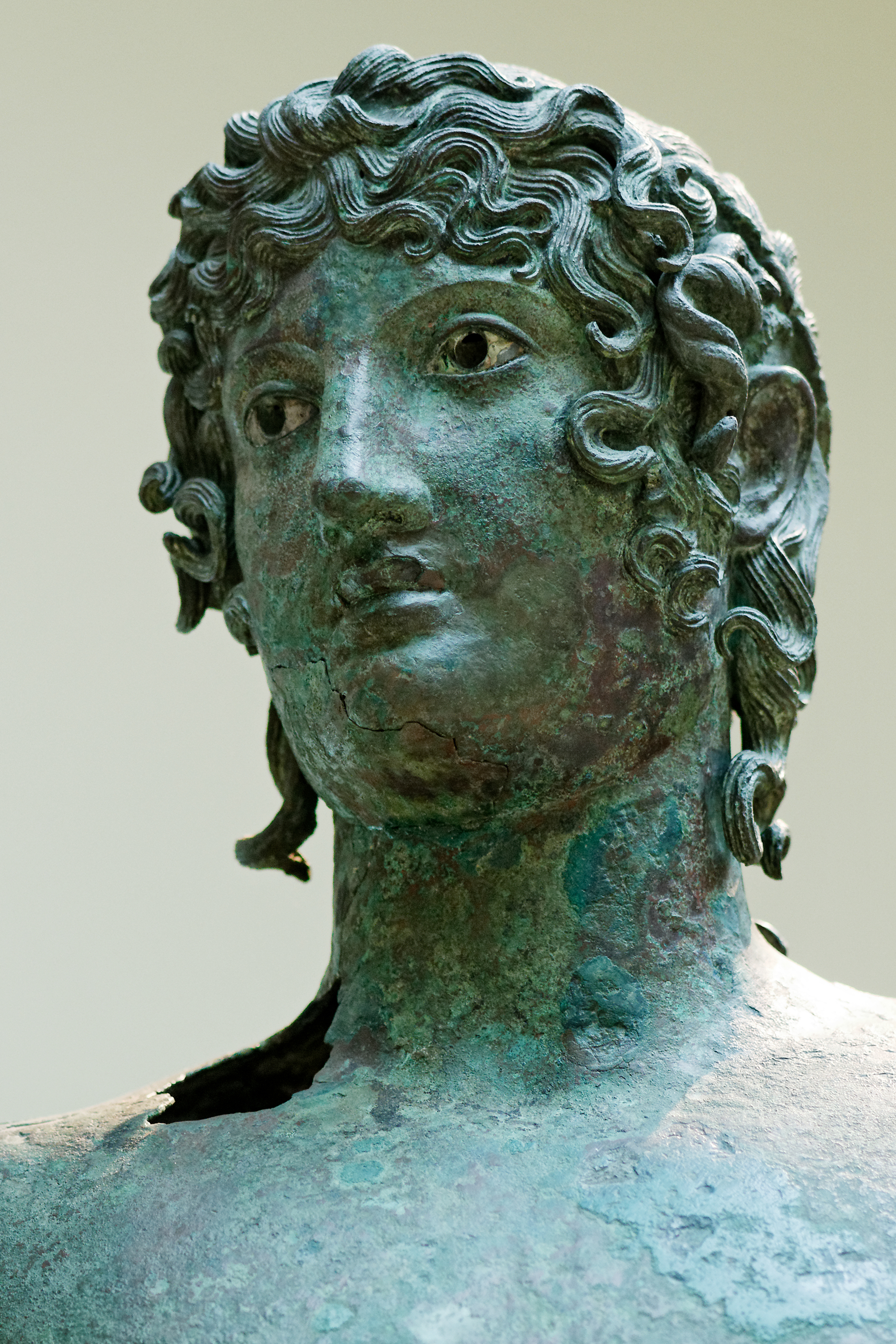
Bronze statue of a nude youth, from Athribis in Lower Egypt (British Museum, London)

The nomoi were grouped traditionally into those of Upper and Lower Egypt, the two divisions each being known as an "epistrategy" after the chief officer, the epistrategos (ἐπιστράτηγος, epistratēgós, 'over-general'), each of whom was also a Roman procurator. Soon after the Roman annexation, a new epistrategy was formed, encompassing the area just south of Memphis and the Faiyum region and named "the Heptanomia and the Arsinoite nome". In the Nile Delta however, power was wielded by two of the epistrategoi. The epistrategos's role was mainly to mediate between the prefect in Alexandria and the strategoi in the mētropoleis, and they had few specific administrative duties, performing a more general function. Their salary was sexagenarian – 60,000 sesterces annually.

Each village or kome (κώμη, kṓmē) was served by a village scribe (κωμογραμματεύς, kōmogrammateús, 'secretary of the kome'), whose term, possibly paid, was usually held for three years. Each, to avoid conflicts of interest, was appointed to a community away from their home village, as they were required to inform the strategoi and epistrategoi of the names of persons due to perform unpaid public service as part of the liturgy system. They were required to be literate and had various duties as official clerks. Other local officials drawn from the liturgy system served for a year in their home kome; they included the practor (πράκτωρ, práktōr, 'executor'), who collected certain taxes, as well as security officers, granary officials (σιτολόγοι, sitologoi, 'grain collectors'), public cattle drivers (δημόσιοι kτηνοτρόφοι, dēmósioi ktēnotróphoi, 'cattleherds of the demos'), and cargo supervisors (ἐπίπλοοι, epiploöi). Other liturgical officials were responsible for other specific aspects of the economy: a suite of officials was each responsible for arranging supplies of particular necessity in the course of the prefect's official tours. The liturgy system extended to most aspects of Roman administration by the reign of Trajan (r. 98–117), though constant efforts were made by people eligible for such duties to escape their imposition.

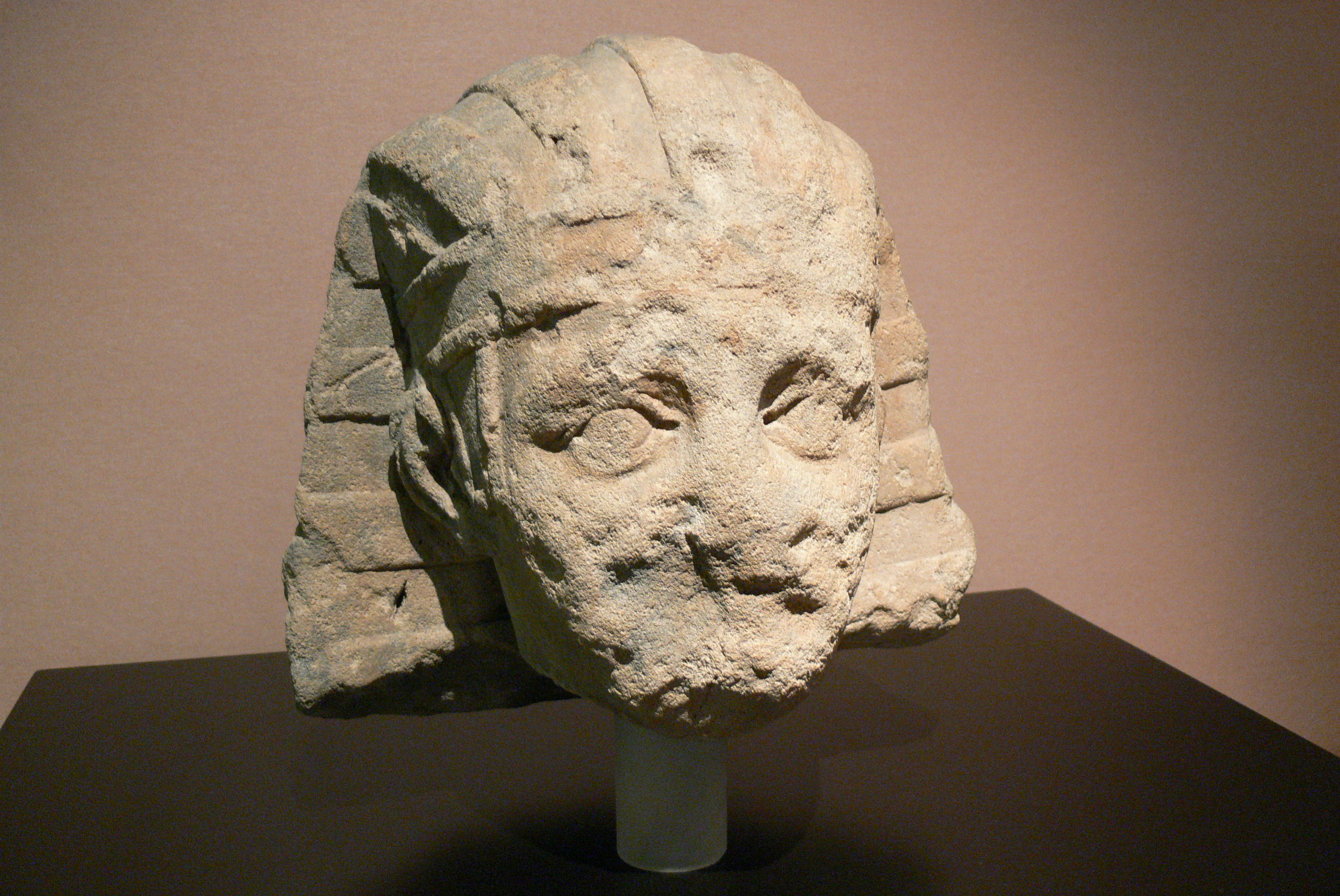
A 2nd-century AD Roman emperor wearing nemes, as pharaoh (Museum Carnuntinum, Bad Deutsch-Altenburg)

The reforms of the early 4th century had established the basis for another 250 years of comparative prosperity in Aegyptus, at a cost of perhaps greater rigidity and more oppressive state control. Aegyptus was subdivided for administrative purposes into a number of smaller provinces, and separate civil and military officials were established; the praeses and the dux. The province was under the supervision of the count of the Orient (i.e. the vicar) of the diocese headquartered in Antioch in Syria.

Emperor Justinian abolished the Diocese of Egypt in 538 and re-combined civil and military power in the hands of the dux with a civil deputy (praeses) as a counterweight to the power of the church authorities. All pretense of local autonomy had by then vanished. The presence of the soldiery was more noticeable, its power and influence more pervasive in the routine of town and village life.

== Military ==
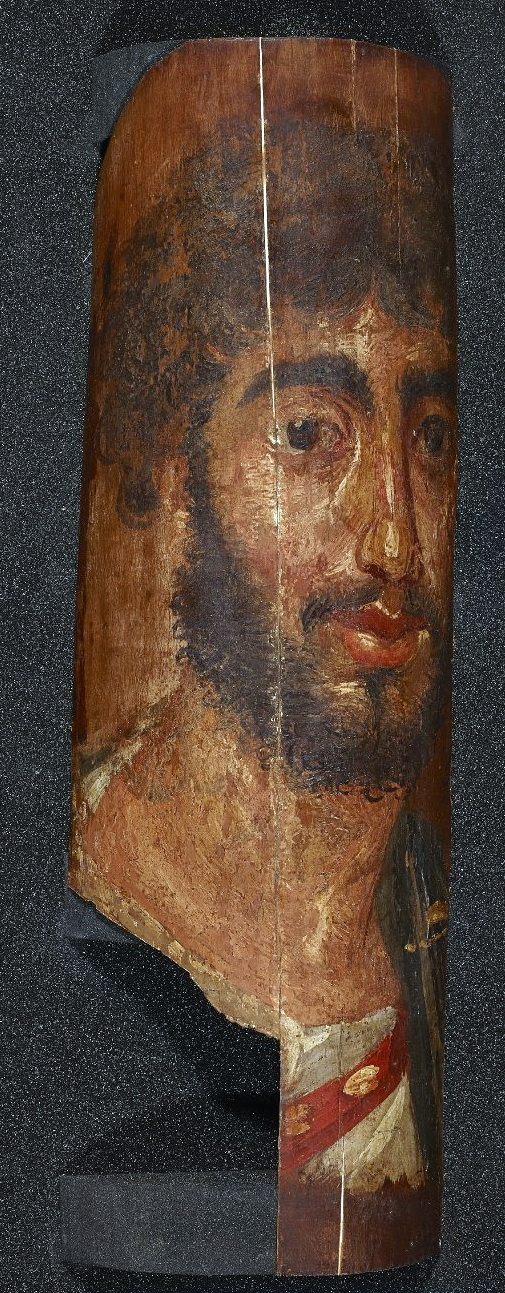
Encaustic and tempera painted Fayum mummy portrait of a Roman officer c. 160 – c. 170, with a green sagum, gold fibula, white tunic, and red leather balteus (British Museum)

The Roman army was among the most homogenous Roman structures, and the organization of the army in Egypt differed little from its organization elsewhere in the Roman Empire. The Roman legions were recruited from Roman citizens and the Roman auxilia recruited from the non-citizen subjects.

Egypt was unique in that its garrison was commanded by the praefectus Aegypti, an official of the equestrian order, rather than, as in other provinces, a governor of the senatorial class. This distinction was stipulated in a law promulgated by Augustus, and, because it was unthinkable that an equestrian should command a senator, the commanders of the legions in Egypt were themselves, uniquely, of equestrian rank. As a result of these strictures, the governor was rendered unable to build up a rival power base (as Mark Antony had been able to do), while the military legati commanding the legions were career soldiers, formerly centurions with the senior rank of primus pilus, rather than politicians whose military experience was limited to youthful service as a military tribune. Beneath the praefectus Aegypti, the overall commander of legions and auxilia stationed in Egypt was styled in Latin: praefectus stratopedarches, from the Greek: στρατοπεδάρχης, romanized: stratopedárchēs, lit. 'camp commander', or as Latin: praefectus exercitu qui est in Aegypto, lit. 'prefect of the army in Egypt'. Collectively, these forces were known as the exercitus Aegyptiacus, 'Army of Egypt'.

The Roman garrison was concentrated at Nicopolis, a district of Alexandria, rather than at the strategic heart of the country around Memphis and Egyptian Babylon. Alexandria was the Mediterranean's second city in the early Roman empire, the cultural capital of the Greek East and rival to Rome under Antony and Cleopatra. Because only a few papyri are preserved from the area, little more is known about the legionaries' everyday life than is known from other provinces of the empire, and little evidence exists of the military practices of the prefect and his officers. Most papyri have been found in Middle Egypt's villages, and the texts are primarily concerned with local affairs, rarely giving space to high politics and military matters. Not much is known about the military encampments of the Roman imperial period, since many are underwater or have been built over and because Egyptian archaeology has traditionally taken little interest in Roman sites. Because they supply a record of soldiers' service history, six bronze Roman military diplomas dating between 83 and 206 are the main source of documentary evidence for the auxilia in Egypt; these inscribed certificates rewarded 25 or 26 years of military service in the auxilia with Roman citizenship and the right of conubium. That the army was more Greek-speaking than in other provinces is certain.

The heart of the Army of Egypt was the Nicopolis garrison at Alexandria, with at least one legion permanently stationed there, along with a strong force of auxilia cavalry. These troops would both guard the residence of the praefectus Aegypti against uprisings among the Alexandrians and were poised to march quickly to any point at the prefect's command. At Alexandria too was the Classis Alexandrina, the provincial fleet of the Roman Navy in Egypt. In the 2nd and 3rd centuries, there were around 8,000 soldiers at Alexandria, a fraction of the megalopolis's huge population.

Initially, the legionary garrison of Roman Egypt consisted of three legions: the Legio III Cyrenaica, the Legio XXII Deiotariana, and one other legion. The station and identity of this third legion is not known for sure, and it is not known precisely when it was withdrawn from Egypt, though it was certainly before 23 AD, during the reign of Tiberius (r. 14–37). In the reign of Tiberius's step-father and predecessor Augustus, the legions had been stationed at Nicopolis and at Egyptian Babylon, and perhaps at Thebes. After August 119, the III Cyrenaica was ordered out of Egypt; the XXII Deiotariana was transferred sometime afterwards, and before 127/8, the Legio II Traiana arrived, to remain as the main component of the Army of Egypt for two centuries.

After some fluctuations in the size and positions of the auxilia garrison in the early decades of Roman Egypt, relating to the conquest and pacification of the country, the auxilia contingent was mostly stable during the Principate, increasing somewhat towards the end of the 2nd century, and with some individual formations remaining in Egypt for centuries at a time. Three or four alae of cavalry were stationed in Egypt, each ala numbering around 500 horsemen. There were between seven and ten cohortes of auxilia infantry, each cohors about 500 strong, although some were cohortes equitatae – mixed units of 600 men, with infantry and cavalry in a roughly 4:1 ratio. Besides the auxilia stationed at Alexandria, at least three detachments permanently garrisoned the southern border, on the Nile's First Cataract around Philae and Syene (Aswan), protecting Egypt from enemies to the south and guarding against rebellion in the Thebaid.

Besides the main garrison at Alexandrian Nicopolis and the southern border force, the disposition of the rest of the Army of Egypt is not clear, though many soldiers are known to have been stationed at various outposts (praesidia), including those defending roads and remote natural resources from attack. Roman detachments, centuriones, and beneficiarii maintained order in the Nile Valley, but about their duties little is known, as little evidence survives, though they were, in addition to the strategoi of the nomoi, the prime local representatives of the Roman state. Archaeological work led by Hélène Cuvigny has revealed many ostraca (inscribed ceramic fragments) which give unprecedently detailed information on the lives of soldiers stationed in the Eastern Desert along the Coptos–Myos Hormos road and at the imperial granite quarry at Mons Claudianus. Another Roman outpost, known from an inscription, existed on Farasan, the chief island of the Red Sea's Farasan Islands off the west coast of the Arabian Peninsula.

As in other provinces, many of the Roman soldiers in Egypt were recruited locally, not only among the non-citizen auxilia, but among the legionaries as well, who were required to have Roman citizenship. An increasing proportion of the Army of Egypt was of local origin in the reign of the Flavian dynasty, with an even higher proportion – as many as three quarters of legionaries – under the Severan dynasty. Of these, around one third were themselves the offspring (Latin: castrenses, lit. 'camp-men') of soldiers, raised in the canabae settlements surrounding the army's base at Nicopolis, while only about one eighth were Alexandrian citizens. Egyptians were given Roman-style Latin names on joining the army; unlike in other provinces, indigenous names are nearly unknown among the local soldiers of the Army of Egypt.

One of the surviving military diplomas lists the soldier's birthplace as Coptos, while others demonstrate that soldiers and centurions from elsewhere retired to Egypt: auxilia veterans from Chios and Hippo Regius (or Hippos) are named. Evidence from the 2nd century suggests most auxilia came from Egypt, with others drawn from the provinces of Africa and Syria, and from Roman Asia Minor. Auxilia from the Balkans, who served throughout the Roman army, also served in Egypt: many Dacian names are known from ostraca in the Trajanic period, perhaps connected with the recruitment of Dacians during and after Trajan's Dacian Wars; they are predominantly cavalrymen's names, with some infantrymen's. Thracians, common in the army in other Roman provinces, were also present, and an auxiliary diploma from the Egyptian garrison has been found in Thracia. Two auxilia diplomas connect Army of Egypt veterans with Syria, including one naming Apamea. Large numbers of recruits mustered in Asia Minor may have supplemented the garrison after the Diaspora Revolt, a Jewish uprising in Egypt, Libya and Cyprus.

== Society ==
The social structure in Aegyptus under the Romans was both unique and complicated. On the one hand, the Romans continued to use many of the same organizational tactics that were in place under the leaders of the Ptolemaic period. At the same time, the Romans saw the Greeks in Aegyptus as "Egyptians", an idea that both the native Egyptians and Greeks would have rejected. To further compound the whole situation, Jews, who themselves were very Hellenized overall, had their own communities, separate from both Greeks and native Egyptians.

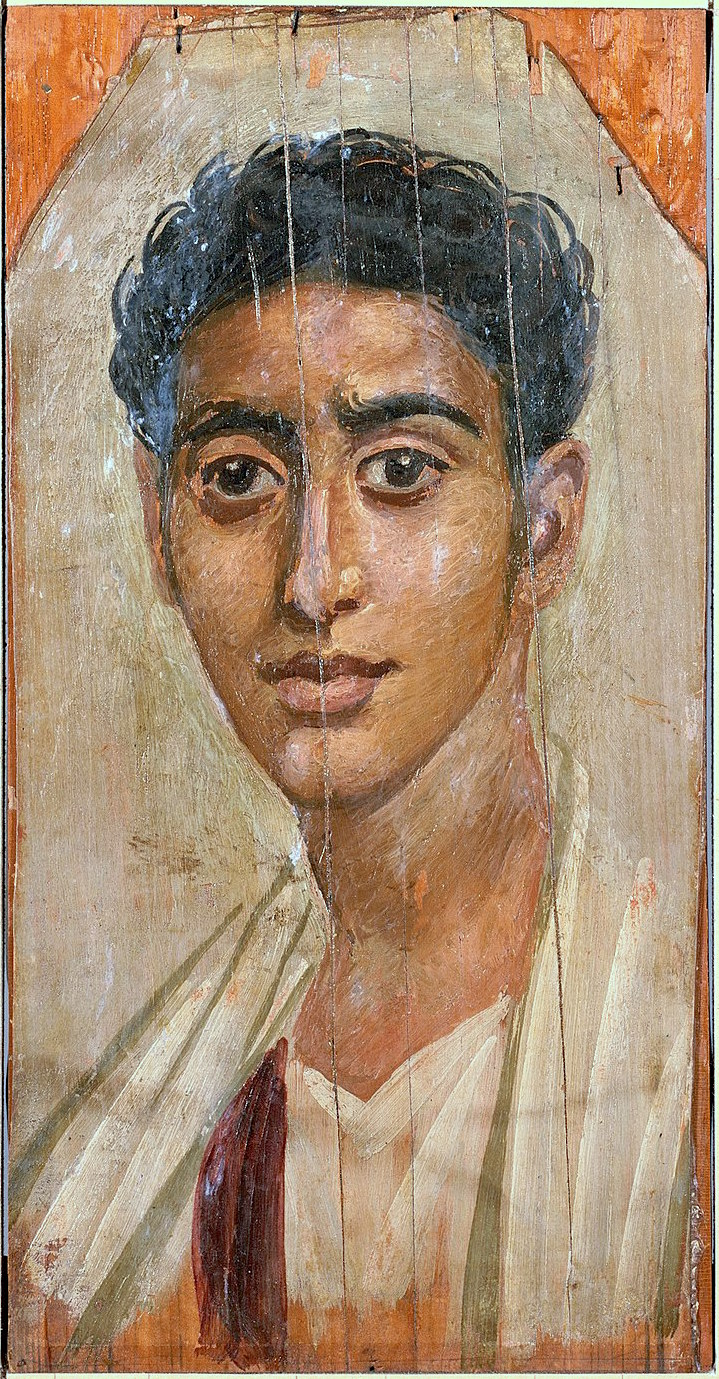
Funerary portrait of a man, late 1st century AD; the mummy was excavated by William Flinders Petrie

Most inhabitants were peasants, many working as tenant-farmers for high rents in kind, cultivating sacred land belonging to temples or public land formerly belonging to the Egyptian monarchy. The division between the rural life of the villages, where the Egyptian language was spoken, and the metropolis, where the citizens spoke Koine Greek and frequented the Hellenistic gymnasia, was the most significant cultural division in Roman Egypt, and was not dissolved by the Constitutio Antoniniana of 212, which made all free Egyptians Roman citizens. There was considerable social mobility however, accompanying mass urbanization, and participation in the monetized economy and literacy in Greek by the peasant population was widespread.

The Romans began a system of social hierarchy that revolved around ethnicity and place of residence. Other than Roman citizens, a Greek citizen of one of the Greek cities had the highest status, and a rural Egyptian would be in the lowest class. In between those classes was the metropolite, who was almost certainly of Hellenic origin. Gaining citizenship and moving up in ranks was very difficult and there were not many available options for ascendancy.

One of the routes that many followed to ascend to another caste was through enlistment in the army. Although only Roman citizens could serve in the legions, many Greeks found their way in. The native Egyptians could join the auxiliary forces and attain citizenship upon discharge. The different groups had different rates of taxation based on their social class. Roman citizens and citizens of Alexandria were exempted from the poll tax. Hellenized inhabitants of the nome capitals paid a low rate of poll tax, while native Egyptians paid a higher rate. Native Egyptians were barred from serving in the army, and there were other defined legal distinctions between the classes. Within the mētropoleis there was a Hellenic socio-political élite, an urban land-owning aristocracy that dominated Egypt by the 2nd and throughout the 3rd centuries through their large private estates.

The social structure in Aegyptus is very closely linked to the governing administration. Elements of centralized rule that were derived from the Ptolemaic period lasted into the 4th century. One element in particular was the appointment of strategoi to govern the 'nomes', the traditional administrative divisions of Egypt. Boulai, or town councils, in Egypt were only formally constituted by Septimius Severus. It was only under Diocletian later in the 3rd century that these boulai and their officers acquired important administrative responsibilities for their nomes. The Augustan takeover introduced a system of compulsory public service, which was based on poros (property or income qualification), which was wholly based on social status and power. The Romans also introduced the poll tax which was similar to tax rates that the Ptolemies levied, but the Romans gave special low rates to citizens of mētropoleis. The city of Oxyrhynchus had many papyri remains that contain much information on the subject of social structure in these cities. This city, along with Alexandria, shows the diverse set-up of various institutions that the Romans continued to use after their takeover of Egypt.

Just as under the Ptolemies, Alexandria and its citizens had their own special designations. The capital city enjoyed a higher status and more privileges than the rest of Egypt. Just as it was under the Ptolemies, the primary way of becoming a citizen of Roman Alexandria was through showing when registering for a deme that both parents were Alexandrian citizens. Alexandrians were the only Egyptians that could obtain Roman citizenship.

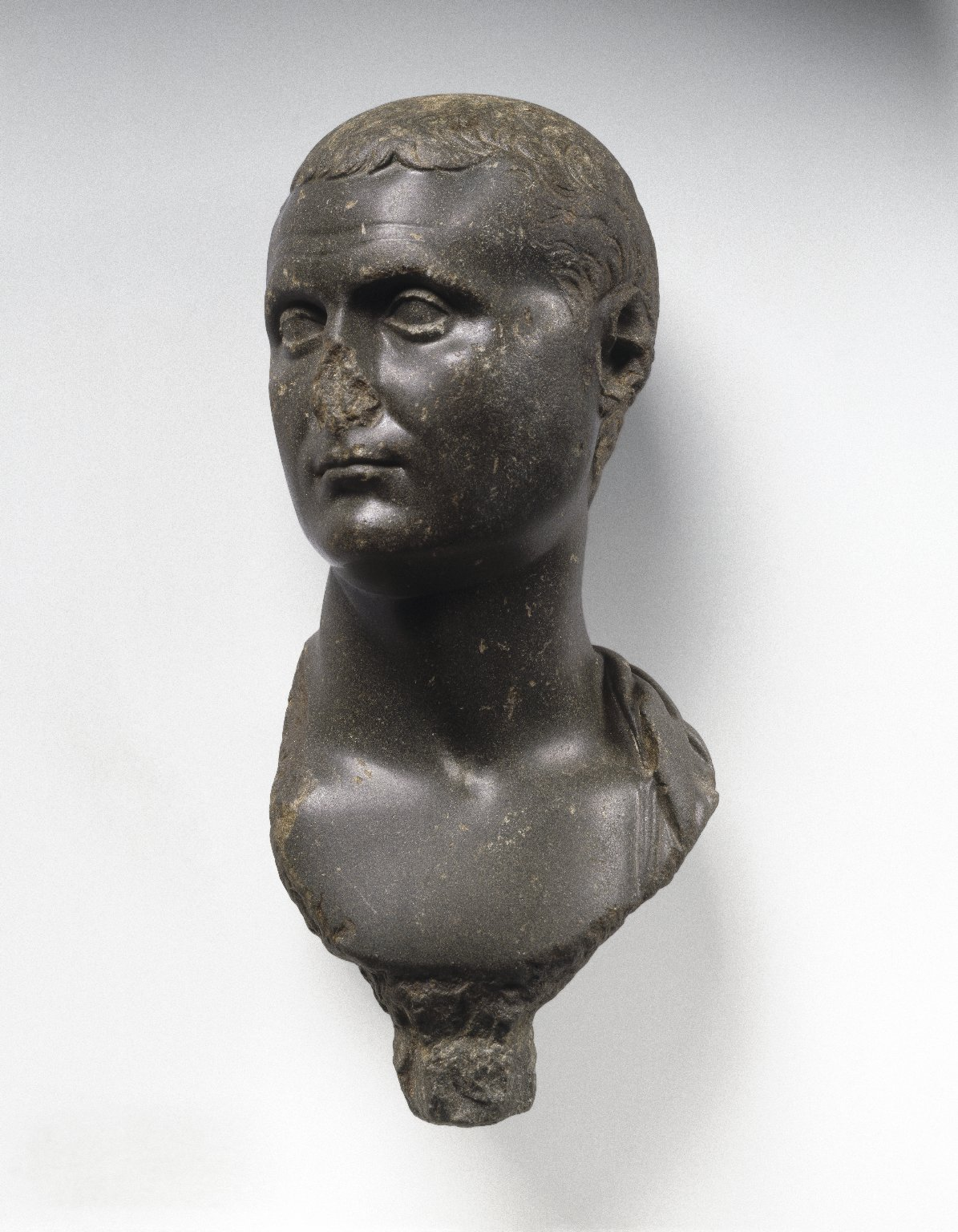
Bust of Roman Nobleman, c. 30 BC–50 AD, Brooklyn Museum

If a common Egyptian wanted to become a Roman citizen he would first have to become an Alexandrian citizen. The Augustan period in Egypt saw the creation of urban communities with "Hellenic" landowning elites. These landowning elites were put in a position of privilege and power and had more self-administration than the Egyptian population. Within the citizenry, there were gymnasiums that Greek citizens could enter if they showed that both parents were members of the gymnasium based on a list that was compiled by the government in 4–5 AD.

The candidate for the gymnasium would then be let into the ephebus. There was also the council of elders known as the gerousia. This council of elders did not have a boulai to answer to. All of this Greek organization was a vital part of the metropolis and the Greek institutions provided an elite group of citizens. The Romans looked to these elites to provide municipal officers and well-educated administrators. These elites also paid lower poll-taxes than the local native Egyptians, fellahin. It is well documented that Alexandrians in particular were exempted from paying poll-taxes, and were able to enjoy lower tax-rates on land. Egyptian landholders paid about 3 times more than the elites per aroura of land in tax-rates, and about 4–5 times more than Alexandrians per aroura of land in tax-rates.

These privileges even extended to corporal punishments. Romans were protected from this type of punishment while native Egyptians were whipped. Alexandrians, on the other hand, had the privilege of merely being beaten with a rod. Although Alexandria enjoyed the greatest status of the Greek cities in Egypt, it is clear that the other Greek cities, such as Antinoöpolis, enjoyed privileges very similar to the ones seen in Alexandria; for instance, like Alexandrians, Antinoöpolites were exempted from paying poll-taxes.

The Gnomon of the Idios Logos shows the connection between law and status. It lays out the revenues it deals with, mainly fines and confiscation of property, to which only a few groups were apt. The Gnomon also confirms that a freed slave takes his former master's social status. The Gnomon demonstrates the social controls that the Romans had in place through monetary means based on status and property.

== Economy ==
Roman trade with India started from Aegyptus according to the Periplus of the Erythraean Sea (1st century).

The economic resources that this imperial government existed to exploit had not changed since the Ptolemaic period, but the development of a much more complex and sophisticated taxation system was a hallmark of Roman rule. Taxes in both cash and kind were assessed on land, and a bewildering variety of small taxes in cash, as well as customs dues and the like, was collected by appointed officials.

A massive amount of Aegyptus' grain was shipped downriver (north) both to feed the population of Alexandria and for export to the Roman capital. There were frequent complaints of oppression and extortion from the taxpayers.

For land management and tenure, the Ptolemaic state had retained much of the categorization of land as under the earlier pharaohs, but the Roman Empire introduced a distinction between private and public lands – the earlier system had categorized little land as private property – and a complex arrangement was developed consisting of dozens of types of land-holding. Land's status was determined by the hydrological, juridical, and function of the property, as well as by the three main categories of ownership held over from the Ptolemaic system: the sacred property belonging to the temples (Koine Greek: Ἱερά γη, romanized: Hierā́ gē, lit. 'holy land'); the royal land (Βασιλική γη, Basilikḗ gē, 'royal land') belonging to the state and forming most of its revenue; and the "gifted land" (Koine Greek: γή εν δωρεά, romanized: gḗ en dōreá, lit. 'land in gift'; Δωρεά, Dōreá, 'gifts') leased out under the cleruchy system.

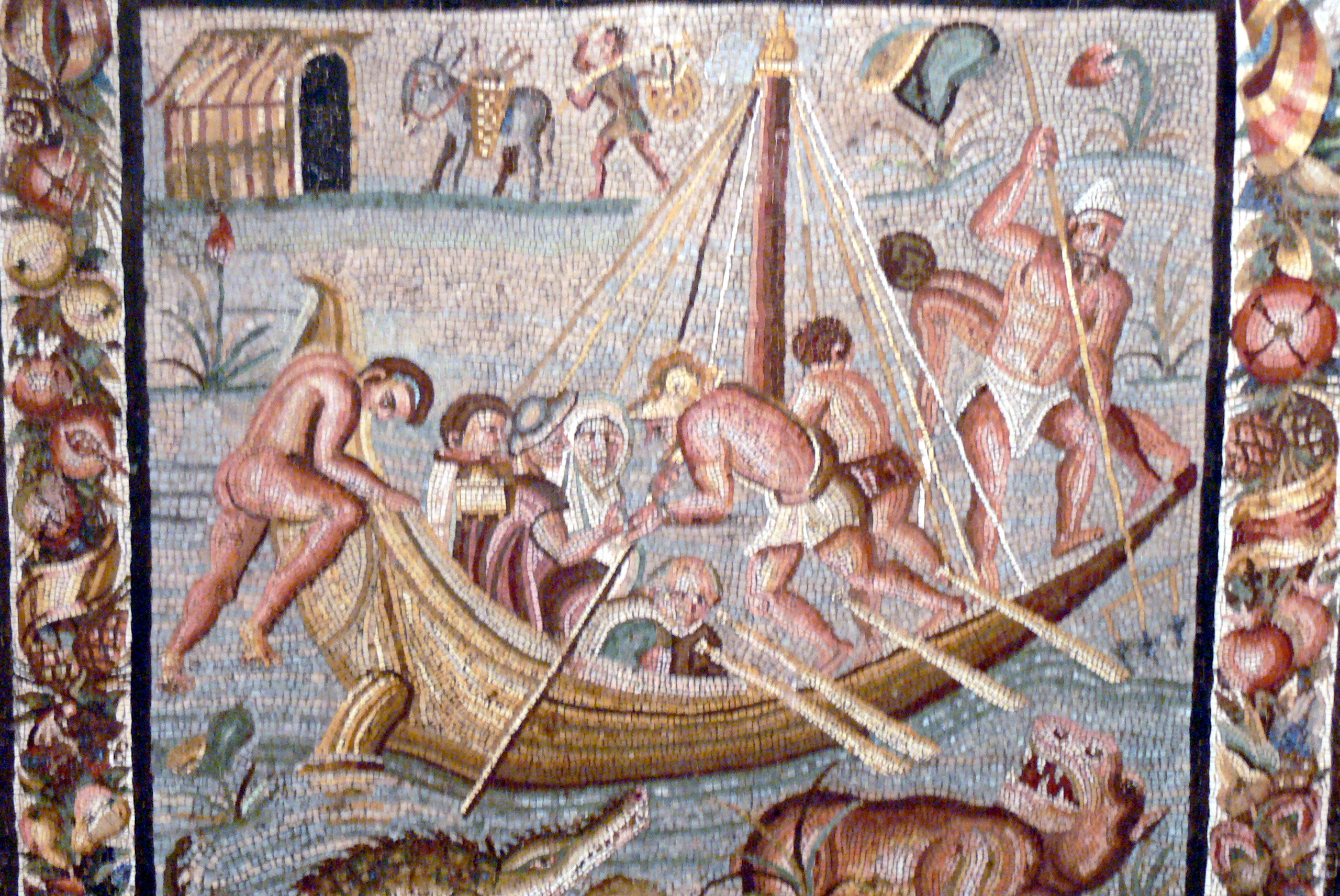
Roman mosaic showing a boat on river Nile, 1st century AD

The Roman government had actively encouraged the privatization of land and the increase of private enterprise in manufacture, commerce, and trade, and low tax rates favored private owners and entrepreneurs. The poorer people gained their livelihood as tenants of state-owned land or of property belonging to the emperor or to wealthy private landlords, and they were relatively much more heavily burdened by rentals, which tended to remain at a fairly high level.

Overall, the degree of monetization and complexity in the economy, even at the village level, was intense. Goods were moved around and exchanged through the medium of coin on a large scale and, in the towns and the larger villages, a high level of industrial and commercial activity developed in close conjunction with the exploitation of the predominant agricultural base. The volume of trade, both internal and external, reached its peak in the 1st and 2nd centuries.

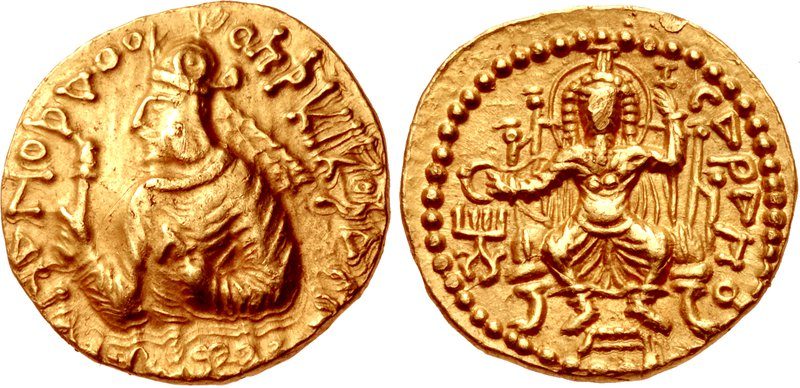
Kushan ruler Huvishka with seated Roman-Egyptian god Serapis (ϹΑΡΑΠΟ, "Sarapo") wearing the modius.

By the end of the 3rd century, major problems were evident. A series of debasements of the imperial currency had undermined confidence in the coinage, and even the government itself was contributing to this by demanding more and more irregular tax payments in kind, which it channelled directly to the main consumers, the army personnel. Local administration by the councils was careless, recalcitrant, and inefficient; the evident need for firm and purposeful reform had to be squarely faced in the reigns of Diocletian and Constantine I.

There are numerous indications of Roman trade with India during the period, particularly between Roman Egypt and the Indian subcontinent. Kushan Empire ruler Huvishka (150–180 CE) incorporated in his coins the Hellenistic-Egyptian god Serapis (under the name ϹΑΡΑΠΟ, "Sarapo"). Since Serapis was the supreme deity of the pantheon of Alexandria in Egypt, this coin suggests that Huvishka had a strong orientation towards Roman Egypt, which may have been an important market for the products coming from the Kushan Empire.

== Architecture ==
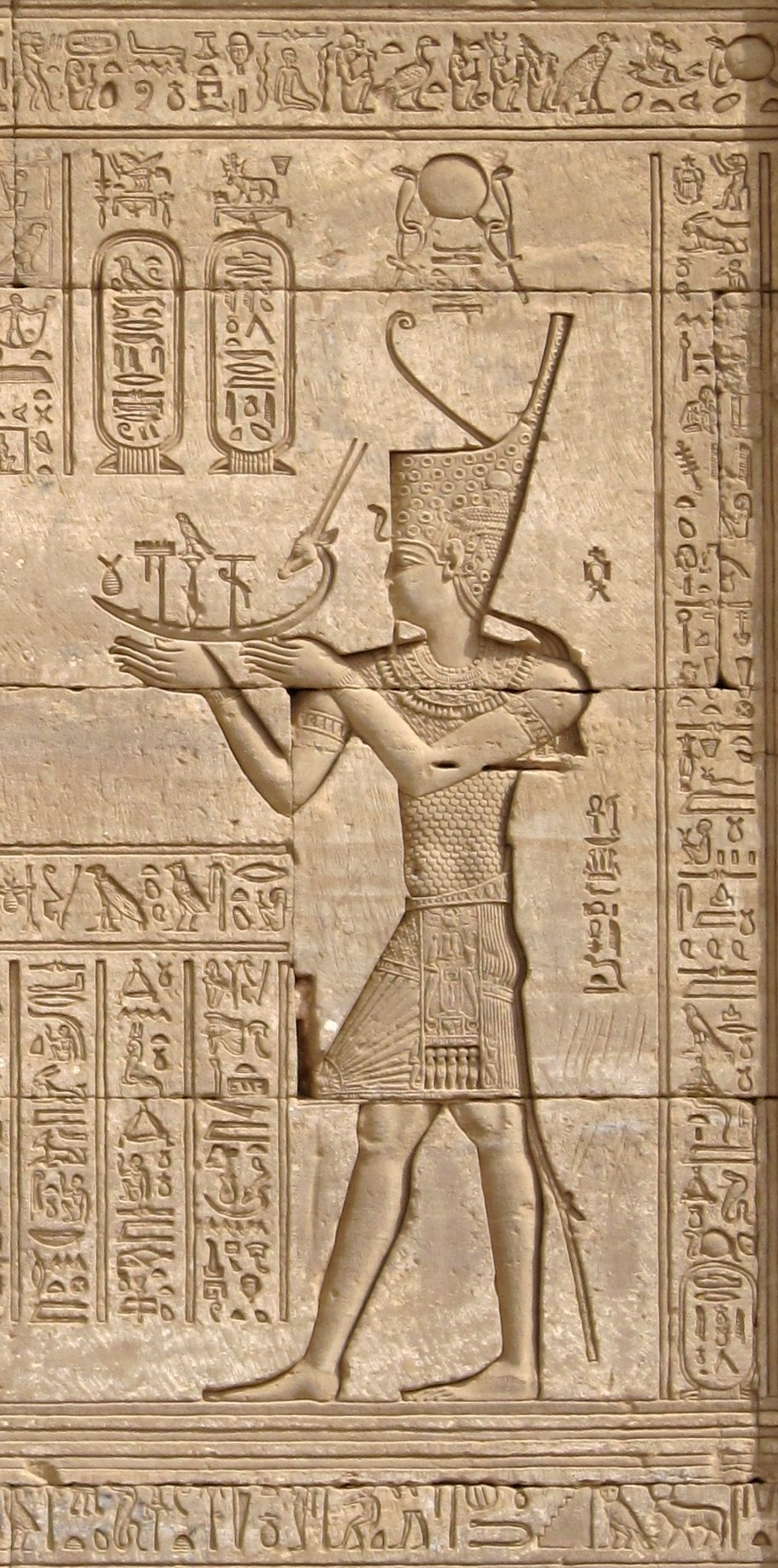
Roman emperor Trajan making offerings to Egyptian Gods, on the Roman Mammisi at the Dendera Temple complex, Egypt.

In the administrative provincial capitals of the nomoi, the mētropoleis mostly inherited from the Pharaonic and Ptolemaic period, Roman public buildings were erected by the governing strategos and the local gymnasiarch. In most cases, these have not survived and evidence of them is rare, but it is probable that most were built in the classical architecture of the Graeco-Roman world, employing the classical orders in stone buildings. Prominent remains include two Roman theatres at Pelusium, a temple of Serapis and a tetrastyle at Diospolis Magna at Thebes, and, at Philae, a triumphal arch and temples dedicated to the worship of the emperor Augustus and the goddess Roma, the personification of Rome. Besides a few individual stone blocks in some mētropoleis, substantial remains of Roman architecture are known in particular from three of the mētropoleis – Heracleopolis Magna, Oxyrhynchus, and Hermopolis Magna – as well as from Antinoöpolis, a city founded c. 130 by the emperor Hadrian (r. 117–138). All these were sacred cities dedicated to particular deities. The ruins of these cities were first methodically surveyed and sketched by intellectuals attached to Napoleon's campaign in Egypt, eventually published in the Description de l'Égypte series. Illustrations produced by Edme-François Jomard and Vivant Denon form much of the evidence of these remains, because since the 19th century many of the ruins have themselves disappeared. South of Thebes, the mētropoleis may have been largely without classical buildings, but near Antinoöpolis the classical influence may have been stronger. Most mētropoleis were probably built on the classical Hippodamian grid employed by the Hellenistic polis, as at Alexandria, with the typical Roman pattern of the Cardo (north–south) and Decumanus Maximus (east–west) thoroughfares meeting at their centres, as at Athribis and Antinoöpolis.

Vivant Denon made sketches of ruins at Oxyrhynchus, and Edme-François Jomard wrote a description; together with some historical photographs and the few surviving remains, these are the best evidence for the classical architecture of the city, which was dedicated to the medjed, a sacred species of Mormyrus fish. Two groups of buildings survive at Heracleopolis Magna, sacred to Heracles/Hercules, which is otherwise known from Jomard's work, which also forms the mainstay of knowledge about the architecture of Antinoöpolis, founded by Hadrian in honour of his deified lover Antinous. The Napoleonic-era evidence is also important for documenting Hermopolis Magna, where more buildings survive and which was dedicated to the worship of Thoth, equated with Hermes/Mercury.

The oldest known remains of church architecture in Egypt are at the Roman village of Kellis; following the house church of the early 4th century, a three-aisled, apsed basilica church was built in the Constantinian period, with pastaphoria on either side, while a third church was accompanied by a Christian cemetery. All these churches were built on an east–west axis, with the liturgical focus at the east, and the pastaphoria (side-rooms) were a common mark of churches in the country. Churches were built quickly after the victory of Constantine over Licinius, and in the 4th century even towns like ‘Ain el-Gedida in the Dakhla Oasis had their own churches. The earliest known monumental basilica of which remains survive is that at Antinoöpolis; a five-aisled, apsed basilica facing east and set in a cemetery is 60 metres (200 ft) long and 20 metres (66 ft) wide.

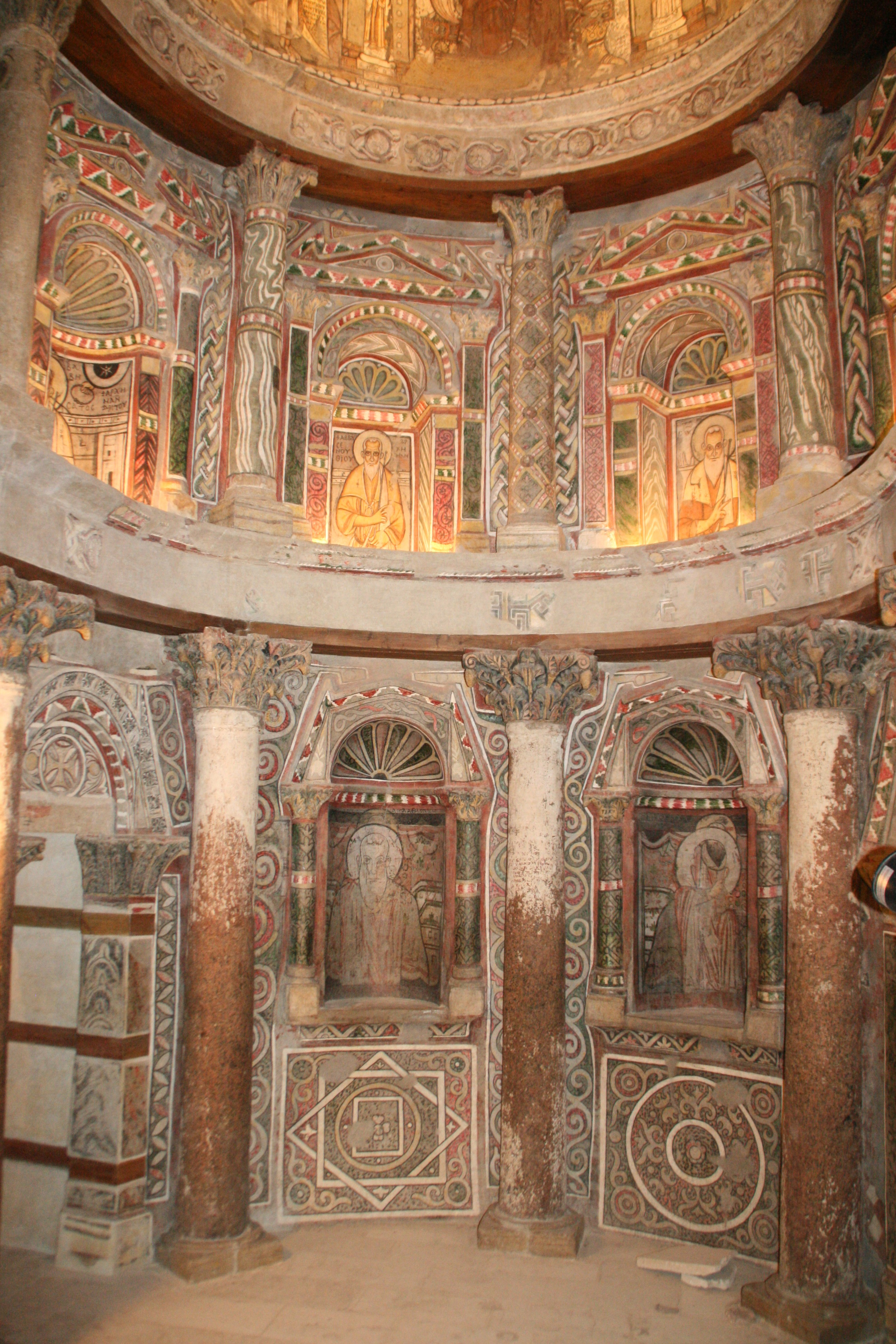
North apse of the Red Monastery of Sohag

In the late 4th century, monastic churches differed from the other churches by building rectangular sanctuaries – rather than semi-circular ones – at their east ends where the altar stood, and in place of the apse was an aedicula or niche embellished with an arch and columns in applied in plaster. In the 5th century, regional styles of monumental church basilica with pastaphoria emerged: on the coast of the Mediterranean and throughout the northern part of the country the churches were basilicas of three or five aisles, but in Middle Egypt and Upper Egypt the basilicas were often given a colonnade all the way around the structure, forming a continuous ambulatory by the addition of a transverse fourth aisle to the west of the other three. In eastern Egypt, the columns and colonnade were emphasized, and the sanctuary distinguished with a triumphal arch in front of it.

A transept plan was adopted only in urban environments like Abu Mena and Marea in the western Nile Delta. In the middle 5th century, the Great Basilica, one of the largest churches in Egypt, was built at Hermopolis Magna at the central crossroads of the city. Unusually, the three-aisled transept basilica had semicircular extensions on the north and south walls. At the Coptic White Monastery at Sohag, the 5th-century church was built with a triconch apse, an unusual design also found at Sohag's Dayr Anbā Bishoi; in the Wadi El Natrun at Dayr as-Suyrān; in the Dakhla Oasis in the Western Desert at Dayr Abū Mattā, and at Dendera. The tomb-chapel of the White Monastery's founder, Shenoute, was also built with this triconch plan and was the first instance of a monastic founder's tomb built in a monastery. Some of the White Monastery's limestone ashlars were spolia; the stones were likely taken from the pharaonic buildings at Upper Egyptian Athribis nearby. The main church's interior is a three-aisled basilica with an ambon and seat, and the usual Egyptian western transverse aisle, but its exterior resembles an Egyptian temple, with cavetto cornices on the roof. Unusually for the Coptic churches, the White Monastery's church has two narthexes, perhaps to accommodate worshippers from outside the monastic community. The affiliated Red Monastery nearby preserves the most extensive painted decoration from late antiquity anywhere and is probably representative of the period's Egyptian churches' interior decoration. Besides the main monumental basilica at Antinoöpolis, there were two other cruciform churches built there in the later 5th century.

== Religion ==
=== Imperial cult ===
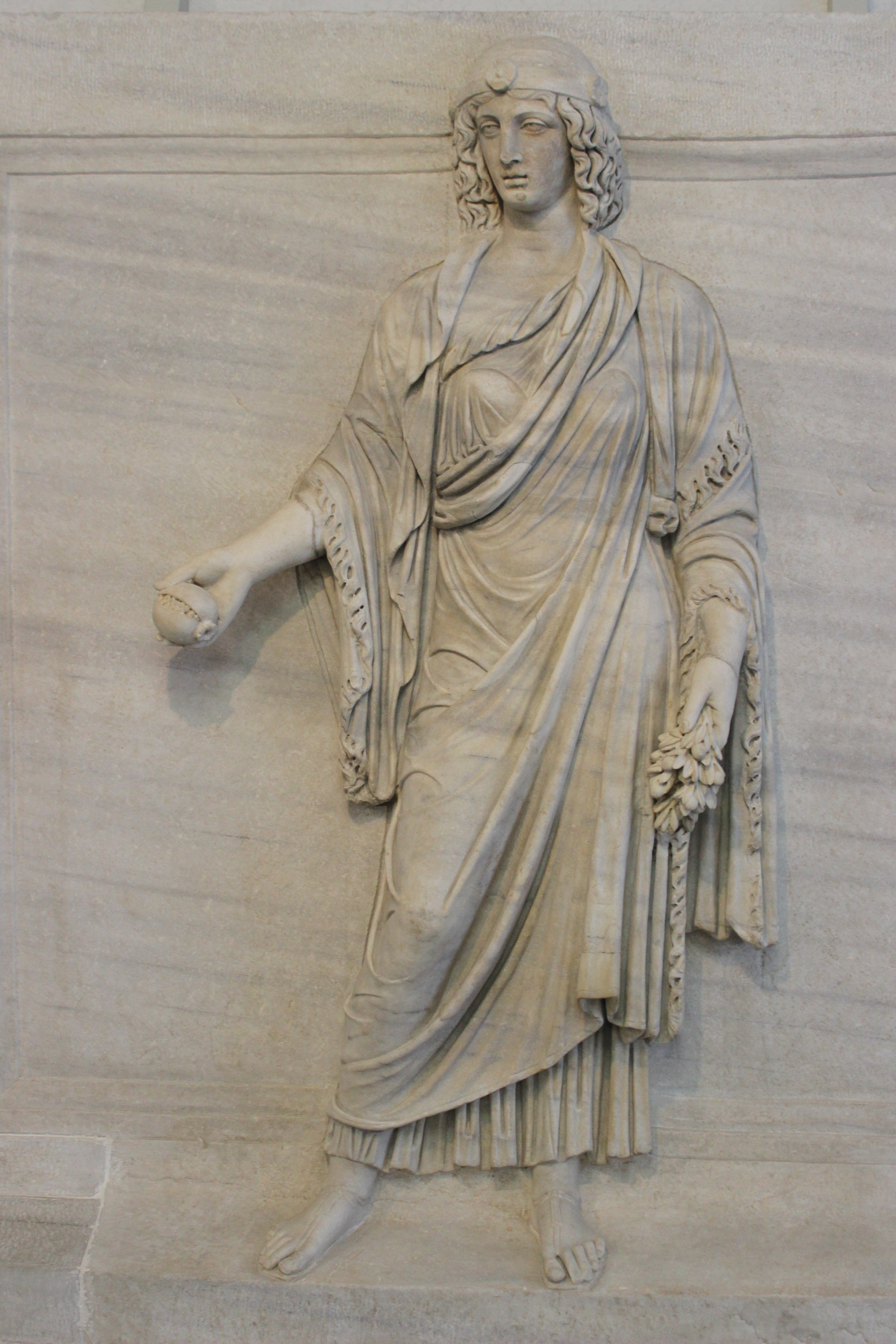
Possible personification of the province of Egypt from the Temple of Hadrian in Rome (National Roman Museum)

The worship of Egypt's rulers was interrupted entirely by the fall of the Ptolemaic dynasty, who together with their predecessor Alexander the Great had been worshipped with an Egypto-Hellenistic ruler cult. After the Roman conquest of Egypt, Augustus instituted a new Roman imperial cult in Egypt. Formally, the "Roman people" (Latin: populus Romanus) were now collectively the ruler of Egypt; emperors were never crowned pharaoh in person in the traditional way, and there is no evidence that the emperors were systematically incorporated into the traditional pantheons worshipped by the traditional priesthoods. Instead, the image of Augustus was identified with Zeus Eleutherios (Ancient Greek: Ἐλευθέριος, lit. 'liberator'), and modelled on the example of Alexander the Great, who was said to have "liberated" Egypt from the old pharaohs. Nevertheless, in 27 BC there was at Memphis, as was traditional, a high priest of Ptah appointed under Augustus's authority as the senior celebrant of the Egyptian ruler cult and referred to as a "priest of Caesar". Augustus had been honoured with a cult in Egypt before his death, and there is evidence that Nero was worshipped while still living, as was Hadrian in particular. While alive however, the emperor was usually honoured with offerings to the various gods "for his health" (Latin: pro salute); usually, only after the emperor's death was he deified and worshipped as a god. A letter of Claudius written to the Alexandrians in 41 AD rejects the offer of a cult of himself, permitting only divine honours such as statues and reserving cult worship for the deified Augustus. For juridical purposes, the imperial oath recalling Ptolemaic precedent had to be sworn in the name or "fortune" (tyche) of the emperor: "I swear by Caesar Imperator, son of God, Zeus Eleutherios, Augustus".

The official cult was superintended by the archiereus for Alexandria and All Egypt (ἀρχιερεὺς Ἀλεξανδρίας καὶ Αἰγύπτου πάσης, archiereùs Alexandrías kaì Aigyptou pásēs), who was procurator in charge of Egypt's temples and responsible for the worship of the imperial deities and of Serapis throughout the country. As with the praefectus Aegypti, the archiereus of Alexandria and All Egypt was a Roman citizen and probably appointed from the equestrian class. The official cult in Egypt differed from that in other provinces; the goddess Roma, closely associated with the Roman Senate, was not introduced by Augustus, since as an imperial province Egypt lay beyond the reach of the Senate's powers (imperium). The archiereus for Alexandria and All Egypt was appointed by the emperor. The high priest's full title ("high priest of the gods Augusti and the Great Serapis and the one who is responsible for the temples of Egypt and the whole country") indicates that the cult of Serapis was closely connected with the worship of the emperors and that both were overseen by the same Roman official.

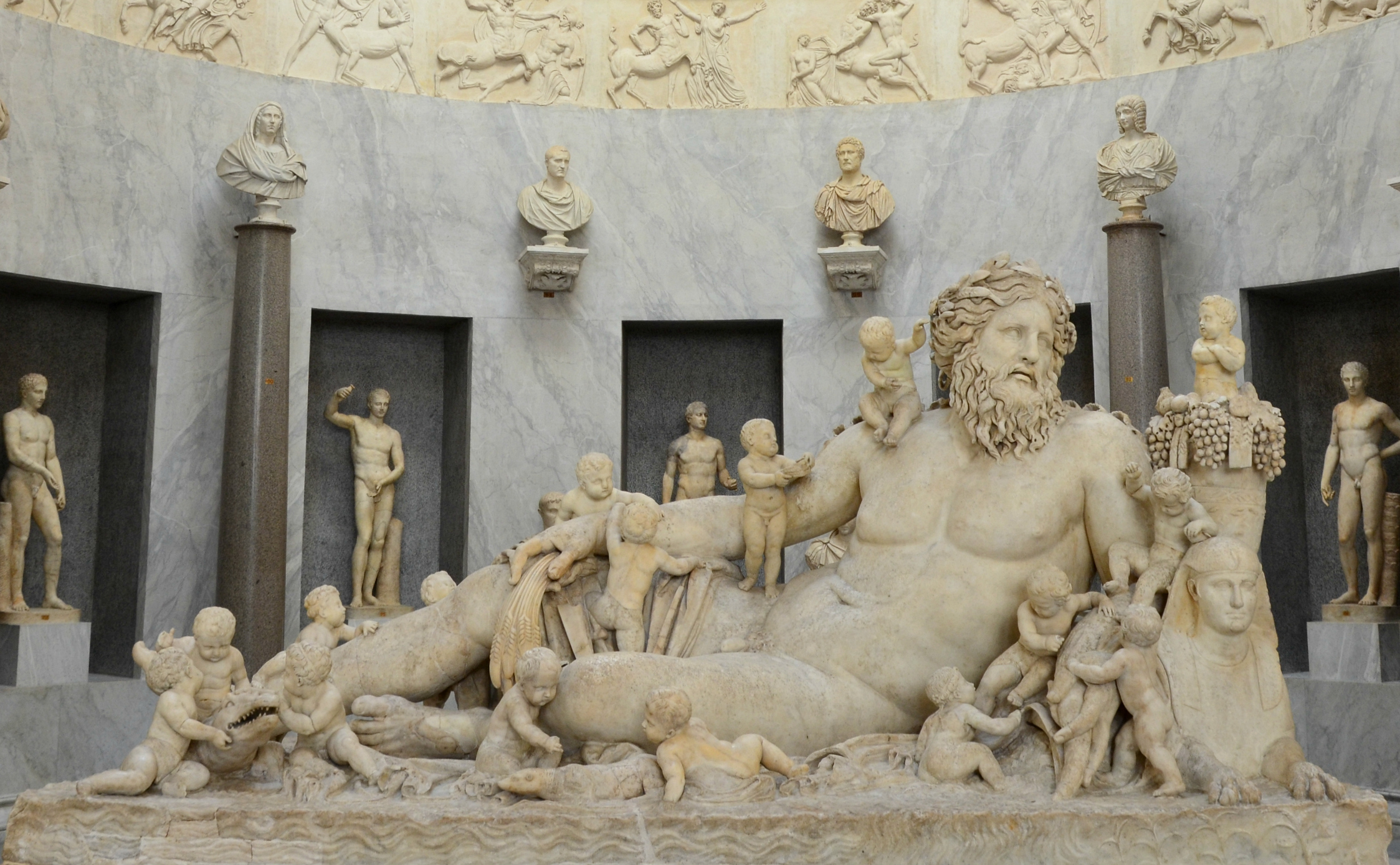
Nilus, the river god of Egypt's Nile, with cornucopia, wheatsheaf, sphinx, and crocodile (Braccio Nuovo). Sculpture from Rome's Temple of Isis and Serapis.

An archiereus existed in each of the nomoi; drawn from the local elite through the liturgy system, these high priests were responsible for the maintenance of the imperial temples and cults in their mētropoleis. These officials, in place since the mid-1st century AD at latest, was each known as the "high priest of the Lords Augusti and all the gods" (ἀρχιερεὺς τῶν κυρίων Σεβαστῶν καὶ θεῶν ἁπάντων, archiereùs tōn kuríōn Sebastōn kaì theōn apántōn) or the "high priest of the city" (ἀρχιερεὺς τῆς πόλεως, archiereùs tēs póleōs), and was responsible mainly for the organization of the imperial cult, since the traditional local cults already had their own priesthoods. Though imposed by the Roman state and overseen from the provincial capital, the imperial cult was locally organized, though direct imperial control is also attested for the cult at Alexandria. Throughout Egypt, sacrificial altars dedicated to the worship of the deified emperor Augustus (Koine Greek: Σεβαστός, romanized: Sebastós, lit. 'Venerable') were set up in dedicated temples (sebasteia or caesarea). Each sebasteion or caesareum had administrative functions as well as organizing the local cult of the emperor. Nevertheless, there is scant evidence that the worship of the emperors was common in private settings, and the Alexandrians were frequently hostile to the emperors themselves.

The form of the imperial cult established in the reign of Augustus, which may have been largely focused on the deified first emperor himself, continued until the reign of Constantine the Great. The widow of the emperor Trajan, the augusta Plotina, was deified after her death by Hadrian. At Dendera, in a temple dedicated to Aphrodite, the late empress was identified with the Egyptian goddess Hathor, the first instance of a member of the imperial family – besides the emperor himself – being integrated into the Egyptian pantheon. Unlike the royal cult of the Ptolemaic dynasty, whose festivals were celebrated according to the Egyptian calendar, the imperial cult days, such as the emperors' birthdays (Koine Greek: ἡμέραι σεβασταί, romanized: hēmérai sebastaí, lit. 'venerable days'), fell according to the Roman calendar.

=== Cult of Serapis and Isis ===
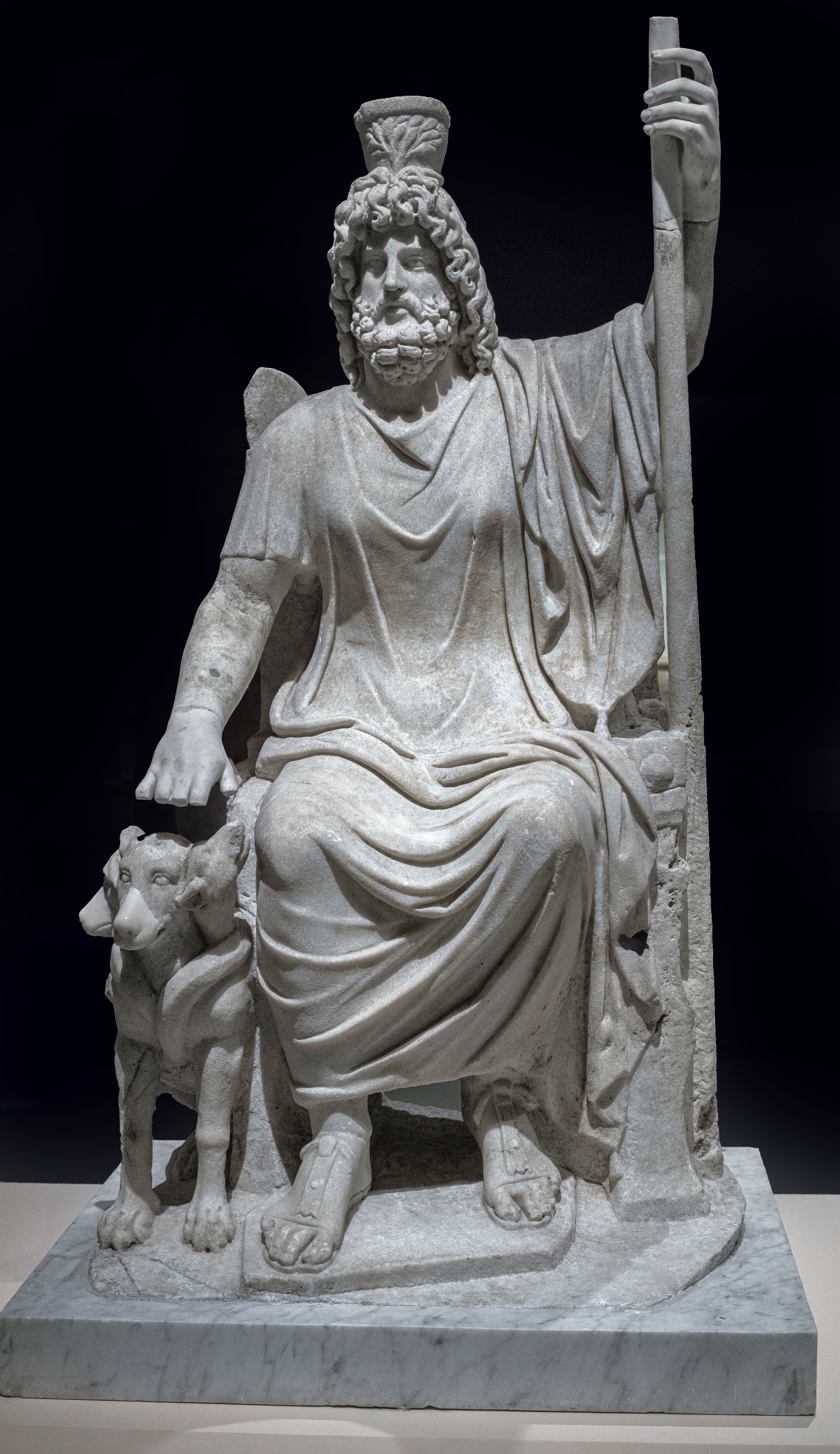
Enthroned statue of the syncretic god Serapis with Cerberus, from Pozzuoli (National Archaeological Museum, Naples)

Serapis was a syncretic god of abundance and the afterlife which united Hellenistic and Egyptian features and which had been instituted by Ptolemy I Soter (r. 305/304–282 BC) at the beginning of the Ptolemaic period, possibly related to the cult of Osiris-Apis. Serapis assumed the role of Osiris in the Egyptian pantheon as god of the afterlife and regeneration, the husband of the fertility goddess Isis, and the father of the child Horus, known to the Hellenistic world as Harpocrates. Emperors were sometimes depicted as Serapis, with their portraits bearing Serapis's distinguishing features, who, unlike most native Egyptian gods but in common with Osiris, was never depicted in animal or part-animal form. Caracalla took the title "Philosarapis" to indicate his devotion to the cult. Serapis was distinguished by his Greek-style clothes, long hair, and beard, as well as by his flat-topped crown, known as a calathus. The Mysteries of Isis, a mystery cult developed outside Egypt and reimported to the country from Roman territories elsewhere, were increasingly celebrated, and Isis was the supreme female deity and creator-goddess in the pantheon, incorporating the Ptolemaic queen-worship tradition. As Isis lactans, 'suckling Isis', she was an image of motherhood, feeding her infant Harpocrates; as Isis Koine Greek: myrionymos, lit. 'the myriad-named', she was a goddess of magic and mysteries.

In Roman Egypt, the cult was superintended by the archiereus for Alexandria and All Egypt. Temples of Serapis (serapea) were found throughout Egypt, with the oldest serapeum at Memphis and the greatest the Serapeum of Alexandria. The holy family of Serapis, Isis, and Harpocrates was worshipped throughout the empire; by the 4th century, the cult had become, behind Christianity, the most popular religion in the Roman world.

=== Temples ===
The imperially-appointed archiereus for Alexandria and All Egypt was responsible for the administrative management of the temples, beyond those of the imperial cult, dedicated to Graeco-Roman deities and the ancient Egyptian gods. He controlled access to the priesthoods of the Egyptian cults: the ritual circumcision of candidates was subject to his approval and he mediated disputes involving temples, wielding some judicial powers. As sponsors of temple cults, emperors appeared in traditional pharaonic regalia on carved temple reliefs. Similarly, Egyptian gods were sometimes shown wearing Roman military garb, particularly Anubis and Horus.

The history of Egyptian temples in Roman times can be studied particularly well in some settlements at the edges of the Faiyum: Archaeological evidence, along with lots of written sources on the daily life of the priests, are available from Bakchias, Narmouthis, Soknopaiou Nesos, Tebtunis, and Theadelphia. For instance, temples can be seen supporting each other by asking colleagues to assist when there was a shortage of staff, but also competing with each other for spheres of influence. When temples came into conflict with authorities, then mainly with lower administrative officials, who belonged to the local population themselves; the Roman procurators intervened in these conflicts, if at all, then in a moderating manner.

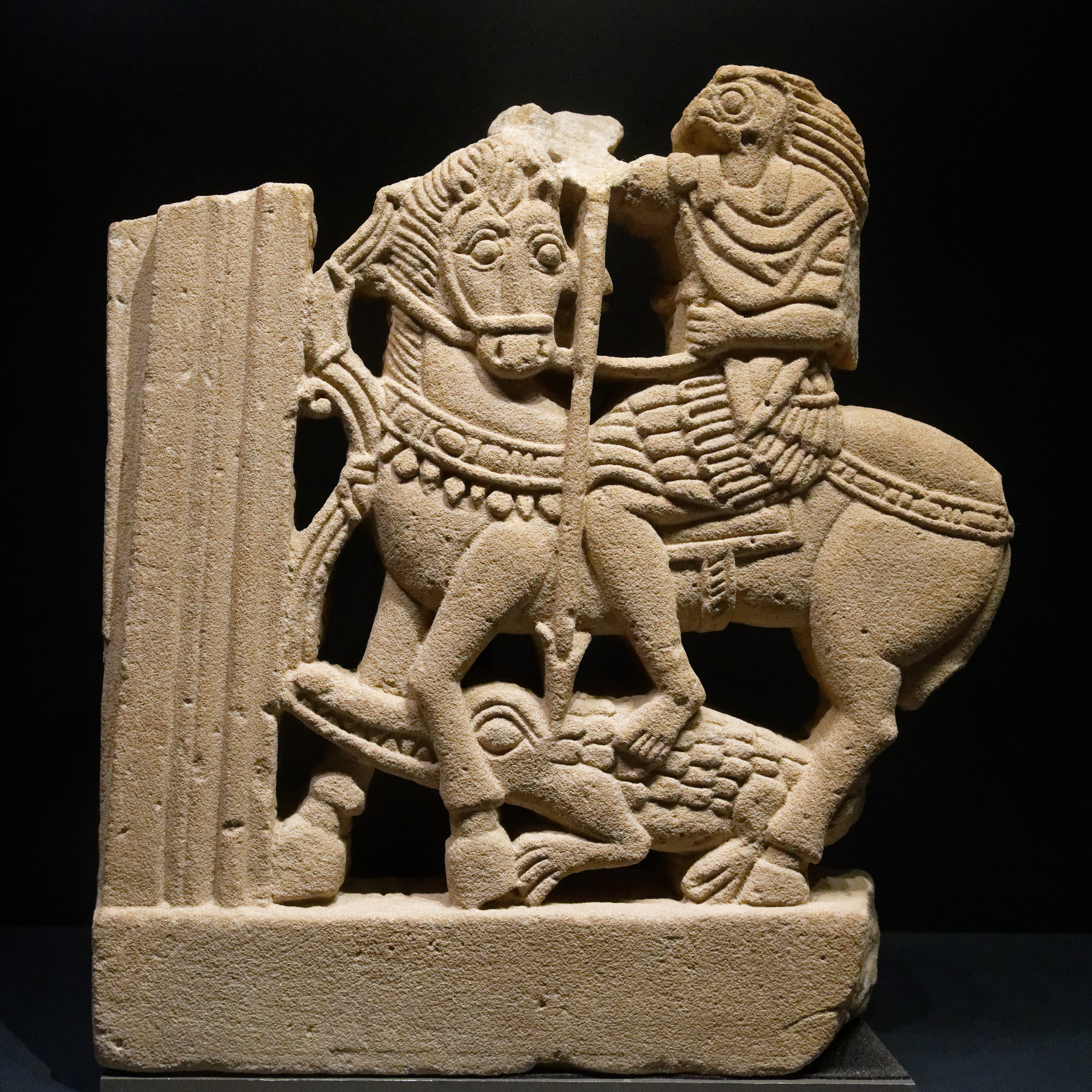
4th-century relief of the god Horus as a Roman cavalryman killing the crocodile, Setekh (Louvre)

The Julio-Claudian emperors Tiberius, Caligula, Claudius, and Nero all sponsored religious monuments and institutions at Coptos and Dendera. Tiberius is known to have patronized monuments at Armant, Aswan, Athribis, Debod, Diospolis Parva, Edfu, Karnak, Kom Ombo, Luxor, Philae and at the Temple of Shenhur. Claudius's patronage is recorded at Aswan, Athribis, Esna, Kom Ombo, and at Philae. Nero is recorded as having sponsored Egyptian elites at the Dakhla Oasis in the Western Desert, and at Karanis and Akoris, as well as at Aswan and Kom Ombo. During the short reigns of Galba and of the contestants in the Year of the Four Emperors after the fall of Nero, images of both Otho and Galba were carved in reliefs at Medinet Habu, a Pharaonic temple dating from the Eighteenth Dynasty, but no monuments to Vitellius are known.

The Flavian emperors Vespasian, Titus, and Domitian are all known to have been responsible for works at Esna. Both Vespasian and his older son Titus sponsored work at the Dakhla Oasis, with Vespasian also the sponsor of work at Medinet Habu. Vespasian and his younger son Domitian were both credited with patronage of works at Kom Ombo and Silsila, and Domitian's sponsorship was also recorded at Akhmim, Armant, Dendera, and Philae. 185 scenes in many temples show Domitian, concentrated in the oases and in Upper Egypt; his name was in some places removed as a result of his damnatio memoriae.

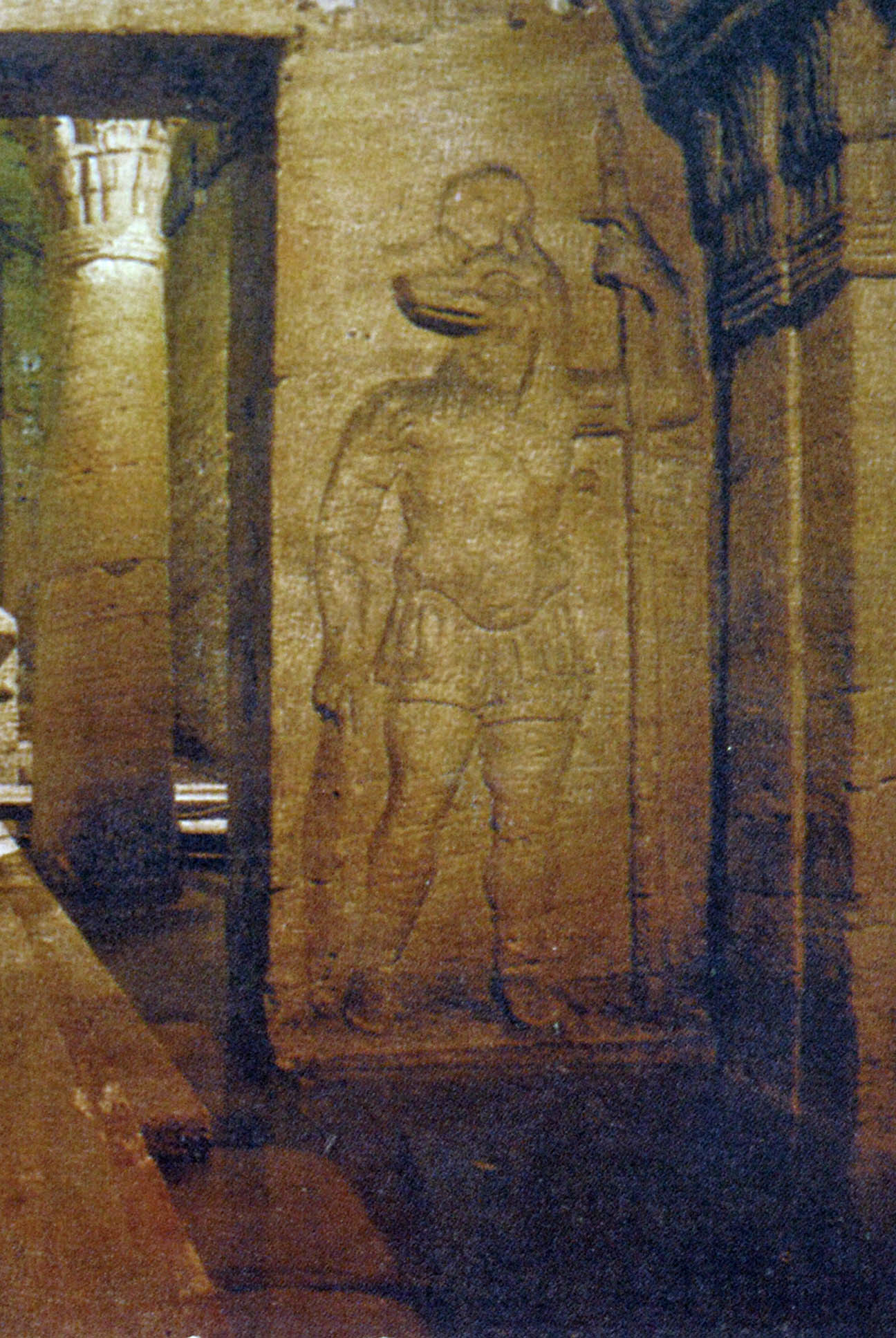
2nd-century relief of Anubis as a Roman infantryman in the Catacombs of Kom El Shoqafa

After Domitian's assassination, the emperor Nerva's patronage of Egyptian temples is recorded only at Esna. Nerva's adoptive heir Trajan continued to lend imperial sponsorship to Egyptian cults, with his patronage recorded at Dendera, Esna, Gebelein, Kalabsha, Kom Ombo, Medinet Habu, and Philae. During Hadrian's tour of Egypt in 130–131, the emperor founded the new Hellenistic polis of Antinoöpolis at the point where Antinous drowned in the Nile and instituted a cult of Antinous as Osiris, to whom a death by drowning was sacrosanct. Hadrian commissioned the Barberini obelisk to commemorate his late lover's funeral rites, including the Egyptian opening of the mouth ceremony; the obelisk was erected in Rome and the cult of Antinous was propagated throughout the provinces. Hadrian also sponsored building work at Philae, and both he and his successor Antoninus Pius sponsored work at Armant, Dendera, and Esna. The reign of Antoninus Pius – also patron of building works at Coptos, Medamud, Medinet Habu, and Tod – saw the last substantial building work on Egyptian temples. After those of Antoninus Pius found at Medinet Habu, Deir el-Shelwit, and Dendera, no further imperial cartouches are known from the regions of Thebes and the western oases. From the reign of Marcus Aurelius, who is recorded as having rededicated an offering to Hathor originally made by Ptolemy VIII Physcon, the rate of new temple building and decoration slackened. Commodus was recorded as Pharaonic sponsor of temples at Armant, Esna, Kom Ombo and Philae, the last emperor to be widely honoured in this way in surviving monuments; a general lack of resources and the political turbulence after Commodus's assassination was probably responsible. The name of his successor Pertinax (r. 193) is recorded at the Temple of Tutu at Kellis. After inscriptions of Commodus, Greek inscriptions are no longer found in the temples of the Faiyum. It is possible that the reform of Septimius Severus at the turn of the 3rd century aggravated the decline of the Egyptian temples; the mētropoleis now given administrative control over the temples of their nomoi did not prioritize their upkeep.

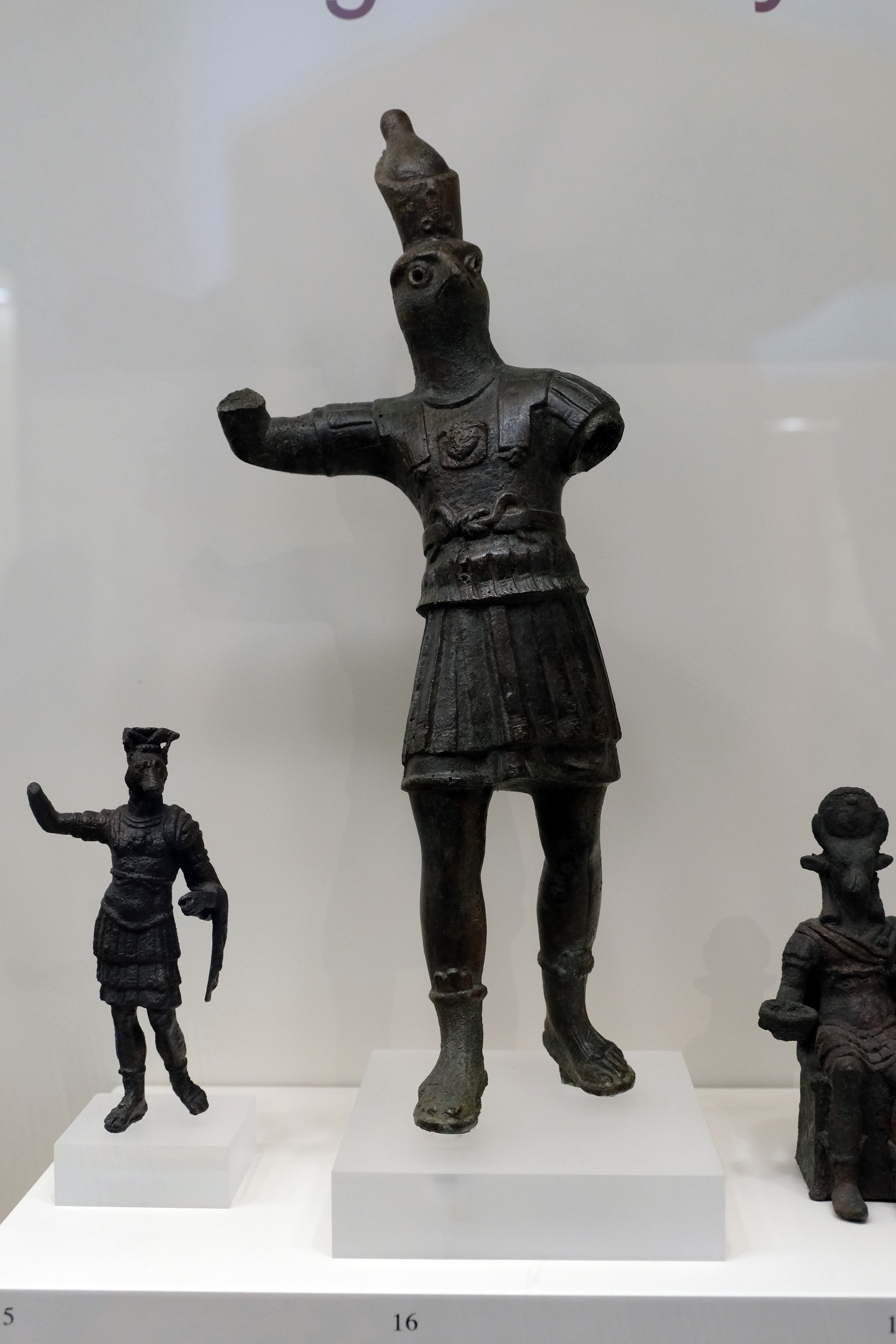
Copper-alloy statuettes of Egyptian gods Anubis (left) and Horus (centre) as Roman officers with contrapposto stances (National Archaeological Museum, Athens)

With a carved relief at Esna, Septimius Severus was commemorated, together with his son and co-augustus Caracalla, his wife Julia Domna the augusta, and their younger son Geta, on the occasion of the imperial tour of Egypt in 199–200. Caracalla's own titles are recorded at Philae, Ombos, in Middle Egypt, and in the Delta. After he murdered his brother and co-augustus Geta, his image was removed from their father's monument relief at Esna as part of the damnatio memoriae imposed by Caracalla. Caracalla's successor was Macrinus, whose patronage is recorded only at Kom Ombo; evidence of his successor Elagabalus in Egypt has not survived, and neither is the patronage of Severus Alexander recorded.

Monumental temple-building and decoration among the Egyptian cults ceased altogether in the early 3rd century. After Philip the Arab's cartouche was added to the temple wall at Esna, his successor Decius's cartouche was carved into it, the last known instance of this long-established practice of usurping pharaohs' erasure of their predecessors' dynastic legacy. Philip the Arab's reign saw the last Roman inscription found in the Temple of Kalabsha; at some time thereafter the site was abandoned by the Romans. At Tahta in Middle Egypt, the cartouche of Maximinus Daza was added to a since-ruined temple, along with other additions; he is the last Roman emperor known to have been recorded in official hieroglyphic script. The last Buchis bull of Hermonthis (Armant) was born in the reign of Licinius and died in the reign of Constantius II; the cartouche on its funerary stela, dedicated in 340, is the last of all. Under the Theodosian dynasty, during the joint reigns of Theodosius the Great and his sons Arcadius and Honorius, an inscription at Philae's Temple of Harendotes commemorated the birthday of Osiris in the 110th anno Diocletiani (24 August 394), the latest hieroglyphic inscription to be dated securely.

Caligula allowed the worship of Egyptian gods in Rome, which had been formally forbidden since Augustus's reign. In Rome, and at Beneventum (Benevento), Domitian established new temples to the Egyptian gods Isis and Serapis. A general "Egyptomania" followed Hadrian's tour of the country, and Hadrian's Villa at Tibur (Tivoli) included an Egyptian-themed area known as the Canopus. Hadrian may have been advised on religious matters by Pancrates, a poet and priest of Egypt.

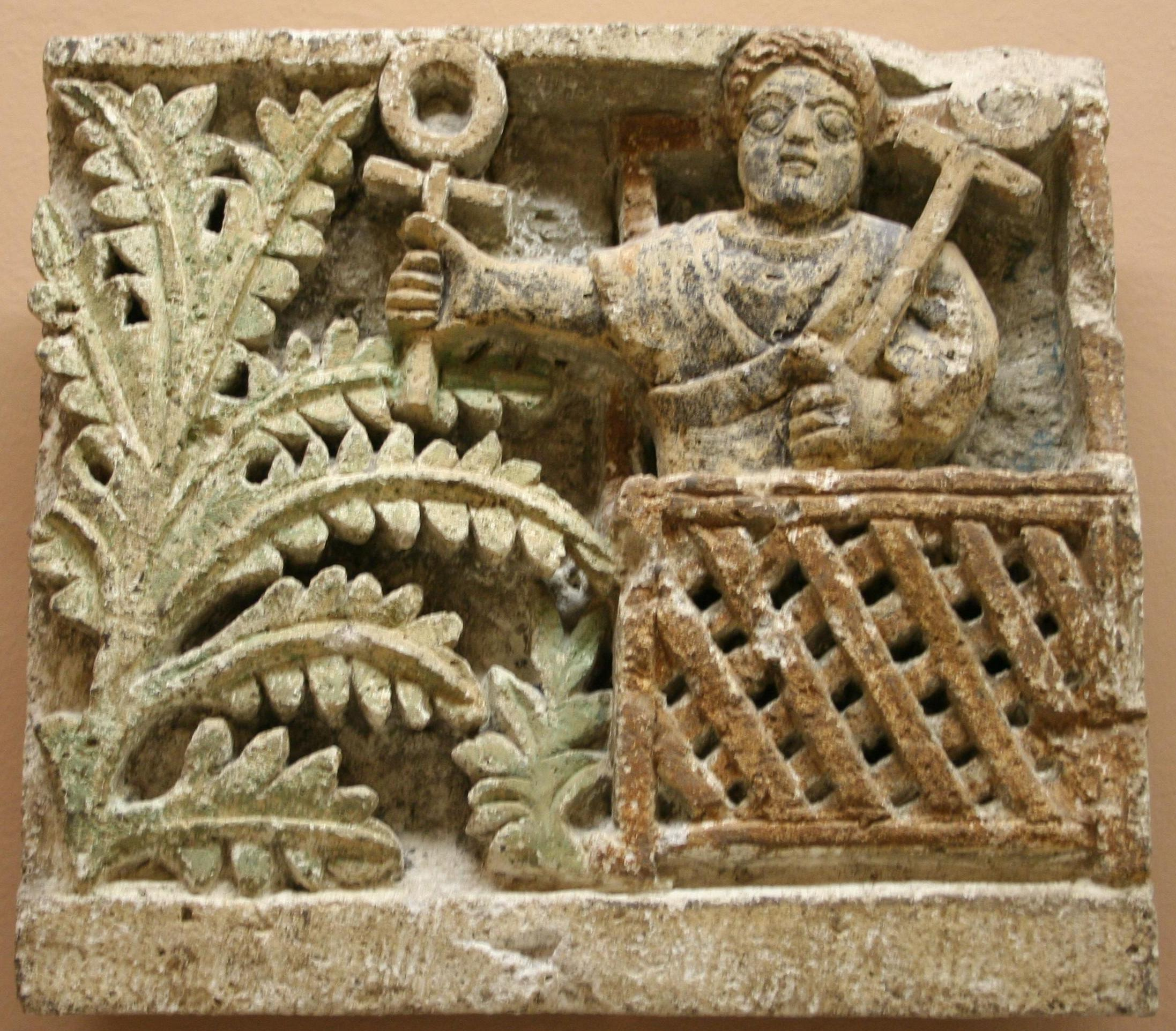
5th-century Christian relief (Staatliche Sammlung für Ägyptische Kunst)

=== Christianity ===
The authors of the New Testament do not record any missions of the apostles to Alexandria or any epistles to the Egyptians, though Egyptian and Alexandrian Jews in Jerusalem are mentioned in the Book of Acts. (Acts 2:10 and 6:9.) An Alexandrian Jew, Apollos, is recorded in the Book of Acts as speaking in the synagogue at Ephesus, and because of an interpolation to Acts 18:24 current by the 5th-century – e.g. in the Codex Bezae – which suggested Apollos had been converted to Christianity in Egypt (Biblical Greek: ἐν τῇ πατρίδι, romanized: en tēi patrídi, lit. 'in his country'), Christianity's arrival has been dated to the 1st century, but there is no sure evidence of this, as Apollos may have been converted elsewhere. The pseudepigraphical Secret Gospel of Mark, of dubious authenticity, is the first text to claim Mark the Apostle visited Egypt. The 3rd-century Sextus Julius Africanus's chronology was probably the source of the 4th-century bishop Eusebius of Caesarea's narrative of Mark's arrival in Egypt, which conflicts with that of the Secret Gospel of Mark and is the earliest history of Alexandrian Christianity, including the names of the ten bishops who supposedly succeeded Mark before the late 2nd-century episcopate of Julian of Alexandria. The drive to connect Alexandria with the lives of New Testament characters was part of a desire to establish continuity and apostolic succession with the churches supposed to have been founded by Saint Peter and the other apostles. Christianity probably arrived in Egypt among the Hellenized Alexandrian Jews, from Palestine's communities of Jewish Christians.

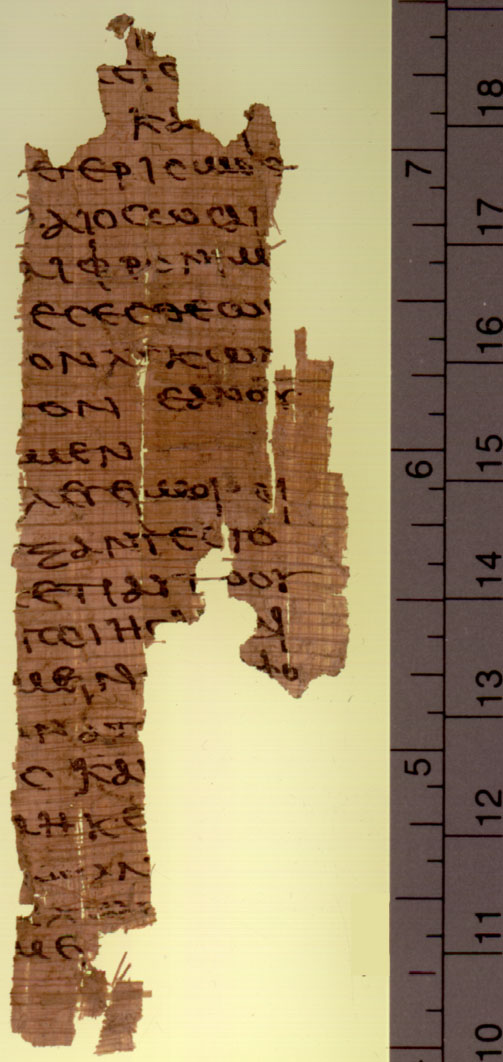
A possible 2nd-century papyrus fragment of the Gospel of Peter, from the Oxyrhynchus Papyri (P. Oxy. LX 4009, Sackler Library)

The earliest evidence of Christianity in Egypt is a letter written in the first half of the 3rd century and mentioning the gymnasiarch and the boulē (thereby indicating the author and recipient were of the upper class) uses the Christian nomina sacra and the Biblical Greek: ἐν κυρίῳ, romanized: en kyríōí, lit. 'in the Lord', drawn from the Pauline epistles. Another papyrus from the same period records the names of candidates for liturgy service "supervision of the water-tower and fountains of the metropolis" of Arsinoë (Faiyum); among the names is one "Antonios Dioscoros son of Origen, Alexandrian", against whose name is noted in Koine Greek: ἔστ(ι) ∆ιόσκορος χρηστιανός, romanized: ésti Dióskoros chrēstianós, lit. 'he is the Dioscoros (who is a) Christian'. With Alexandrian citizenship and a Roman nomen, Antonios (Latin: Antonius) was likely of higher social status than the other candidates on the list, and is the first named Egyptian Christian for which evidence exists. In the Chora beyond Alexandria, there is no evidence at all for Christianity in the 2nd century, excepting some ambiguous letters, besides some papyrus fragments of scriptures among the Oxyrhynchus Papyri and among the papyri found at Antinoöpolis and Hipponon (Qarara) in the Heracleopolite nome around Heracleopolis Magna. Many of these are in the form of codices rather than scrolls, the codex being preferred by Christian scribes. Among the 2nd-century New Testament papyri are Rylands Library Papyrus P52 and Oxyrhynchus Papyrus 3523 – fragments of the Gospel of John –, and Oxyrhynchus Papyrus LXIV 4404 a fragment of the Gospel of Matthew. It is not known whether these indicate a Christian presence outside the capital in the 2nd century, whether these papyri, dated subjectively by palaeography, are as old as has been proposed, or whether they were in Egypt when newly made or arrived in later times as already old books.

Bishops often named their successors (e.g. Peter, his brother, by Athanasius in 373) or the succession was effected by imposing the hands of a deceased bishop on the one chosen to follow him. By 200 it is clear that Alexandria was one of the great Christian centres. The Christian apologists Clement of Alexandria and Origen both lived part or all of their lives in that city, where they wrote, taught, and debated. With the Edict of Milan in 313, Constantine I ended the persecution of Christians. Over the course of the 5th century, paganism was suppressed and lost its following, as the poet Palladas pointedly noted. It lingered underground for many decades: the final edict against paganism was issued in 435, but graffiti at Philae in Upper Egypt proves worship of Isis persisted at its temples into the 6th century. Many Egyptian Jews also became Christians, but many others refused to do so, leaving them as the only sizable religious minority in a Christian country. In the 4th century CE, Coptic missionary work extended to the area of present-day Ethiopia.

No sooner had the Egyptian Church achieved freedom and supremacy than it became subject to a schism and prolonged conflict which at times descended into civil war. Alexandria became the centre of the first great split in the Christian world, between the Arians, named for the Alexandrian priest Arius, and their opponents, represented by Athanasius, who became Archbishop of Alexandria in 326 after the First Council of Nicaea rejected Arius's views. The Arian controversy caused years of riots and rebellions throughout most of the 4th century. In the course of one of these, the great temple of Serapis, the stronghold of paganism, was destroyed. Athanasius was alternately expelled from Alexandria and reinstated as its Archbishop between five and seven times.

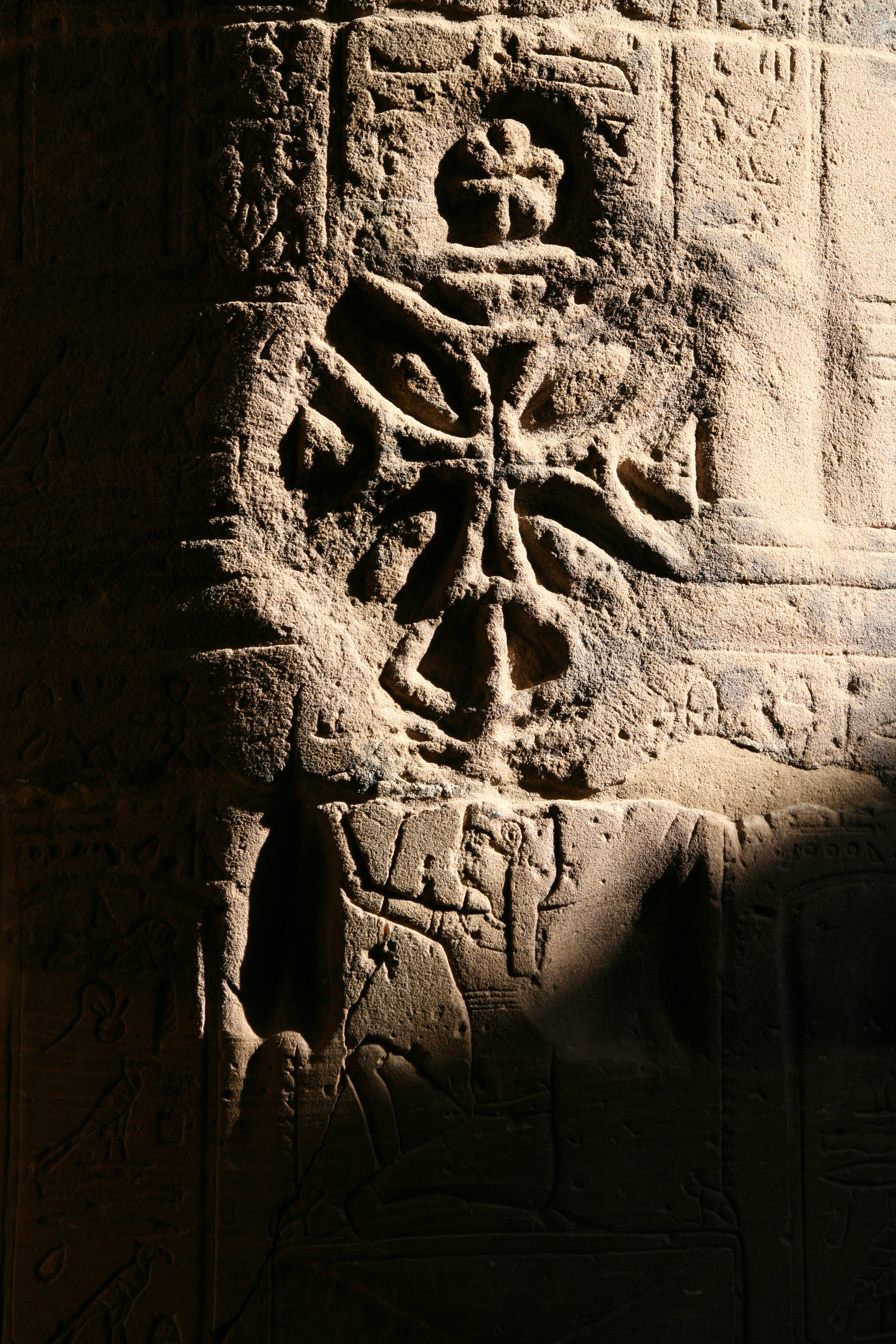
Coptic cross and chi-rho carved into older reliefs at the Temple of Isis at Philae

Patristic authorship was dominated by Egyptian contributions: Athanasius, Didymus the Blind and Cyril, and the power of the Alexandrian see embodied in Athanasius, Theophilus, his nephew, Cyril and shortly by Dioscuros.

Egypt had an ancient tradition of religious speculation, enabling a variety of controversial religious views to thrive there. Not only did Arianism flourish, but other doctrines, such as Gnosticism and Manichaeism, either native or imported, found many followers. Another religious development in Egypt was the monasticism of the Desert Fathers, who renounced the material world in order to live a life of poverty in devotion to the Church.

Egyptian Christians took up monasticism with such enthusiasm that the Emperor Valens had to restrict the number of men who could become monks. Egypt exported monasticism to the rest of the Christian world. Another development of this period was the development of Coptic, a form of the Ancient Egyptian language written with the Greek alphabet supplemented by several signs to represent sounds present in Egyptian which were not present in Greek. It was invented to ensure the correct pronunciation of magical words and names in pagan texts, the so-called Greek Magical Papyri. Coptic was soon adopted by early Christians to spread the word of the gospel to native Egyptians and it became the liturgical language of Egyptian Christianity and remains so to this day.

Christianity eventually spread out west to the Berbers. The Coptic Church was established in Egypt. Later on in the seventh and eighth centuries, Christianity spread out to Nubia.

The fall of the Western Empire in the 5th century further isolated the Egyptian Romans from Rome's culture and hastened the growth of Christianity. The success of Christianity led to a virtual abandonment of pharaonic traditions: with the disappearance of the Egyptian priests and priestesses who officiated at the temples, no-one could read the hieroglyphs of Pharaonic Egypt, and its temples were converted to churches or abandoned to the desert.

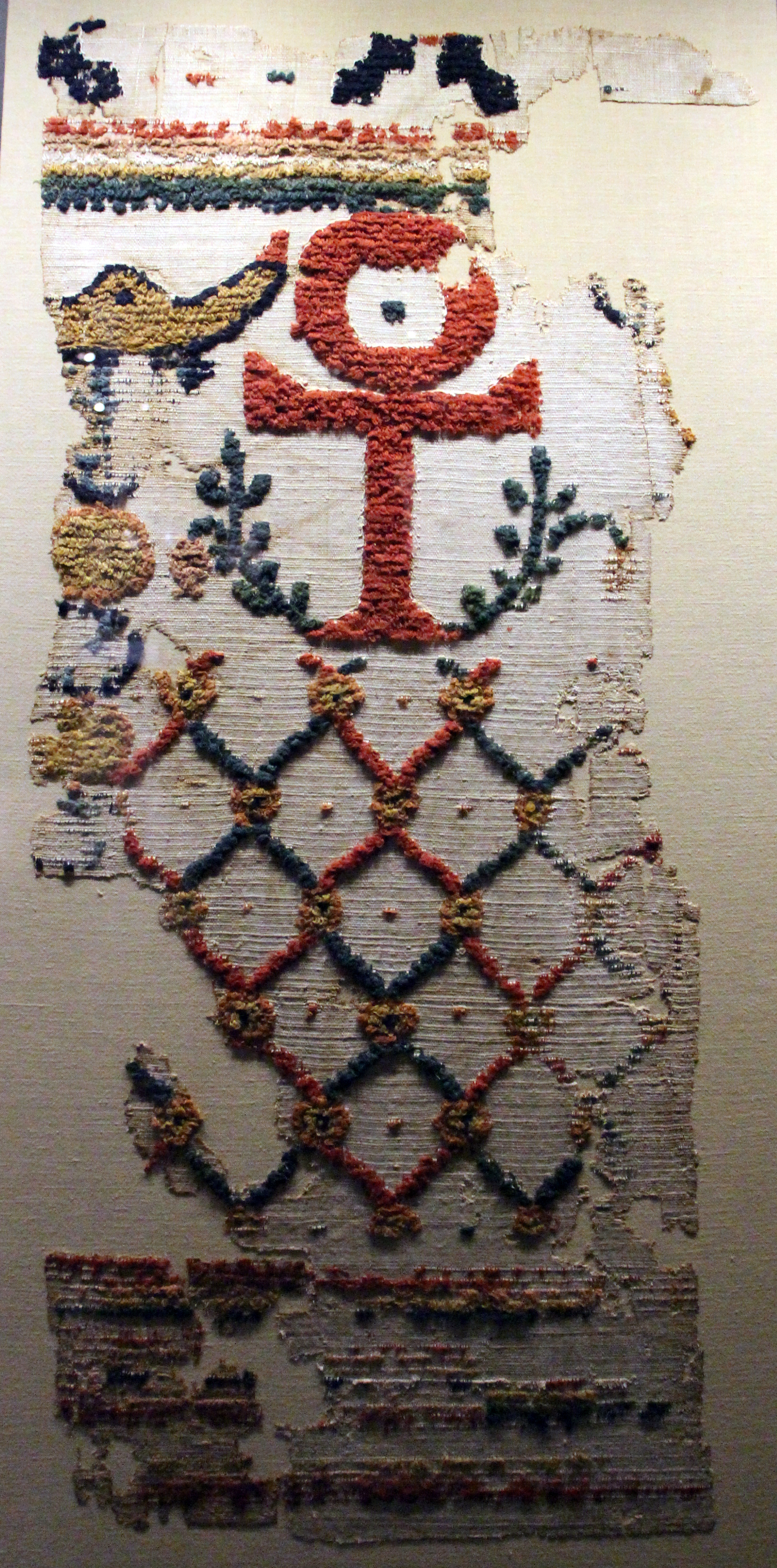
Roman-era Christian-themed wool-and-linen Egyptian textile (Louvre)

Cyril, the patriarch of Alexandria, convinced the city's governor to expel the Jews from the city in 415 with the aid of the mob, in response to the Jews' alleged night-time massacre of many Christians The murder of the philosopher Hypatia in March 415 marked a dramatic turn in classical Hellenic culture in Egypt but philosophy thrived in sixth century Alexandria. Another schism in the Church produced prolonged disturbances and may have alienated Egypt from the Empire. The countless papyrus finds mark the continuance of Greek culture and institutions at various levels.

The new religious controversy was over the Christ's human and divine nature. The issue was whether he had two natures, human and divine, or a combined one (hypostatic union from his humanity and divinity). In an intensely religious age, it was enough to divide an empire. The Miaphysite controversy arose after the First Council of Constantinople in 381 and continued until well after the Council of Chalcedon in 451, which ruled in favour of the position that Christ was "one person in two natures" as opposed to Monophysitism (a single nature).

Monophysite belief was not held by the Miaphysites as they stated that Jesus was out of two natures in one nature called, the "Incarnate Logos of God". Many of the Miaphysites claimed that they were misunderstood, that there was really no difference between their position be the Chalcedonian position, and that the Council of Chalcedon ruled against them because of political motivations alone. The Church of Alexandria split from the Churches of Rome and Constantinople over this issue, creating what would become the Coptic Orthodox Church of Alexandria, which remains a major force in Egyptian religious life today. Egypt and Syria remained hotbeds of Miaphysite sentiment, and organised resistance to the Chalcedonian view was not suppressed until the 570s.

== History ==
=== Early Roman Egypt (30 BC–4th century) ===
The province was established in 30 BC after Octavian (the future Roman emperor Augustus) defeated his rival Mark Antony, deposed Pharaoh Cleopatra, and annexed the Ptolemaic Kingdom to the Roman Empire.

Maps of Roman Egypt

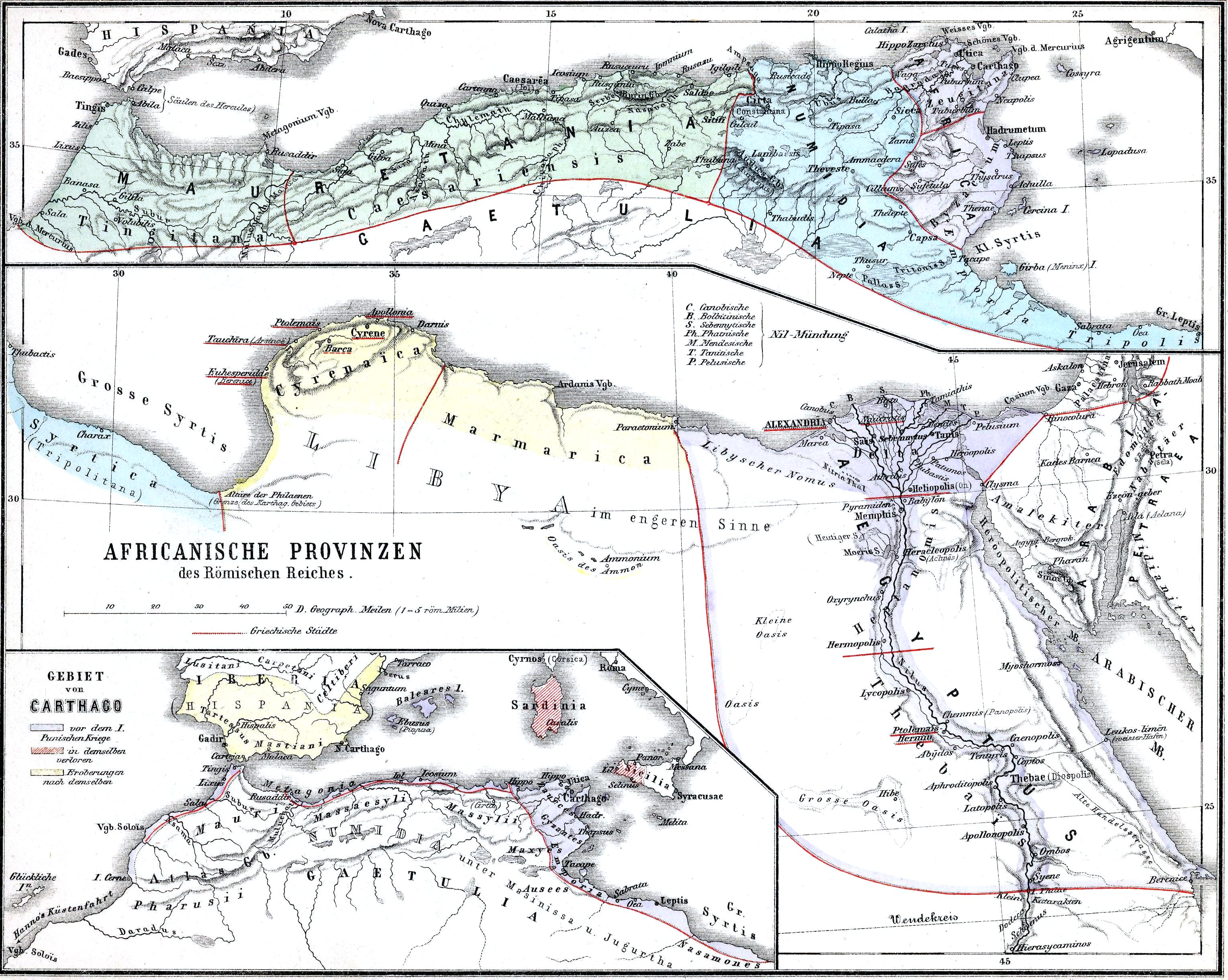
Northern Africa under Roman rule

The Roman Empire during the reign of Hadrian (117–138). Two legions were deployed in the imperial province of Aegyptus (Egypt) in the year 125.

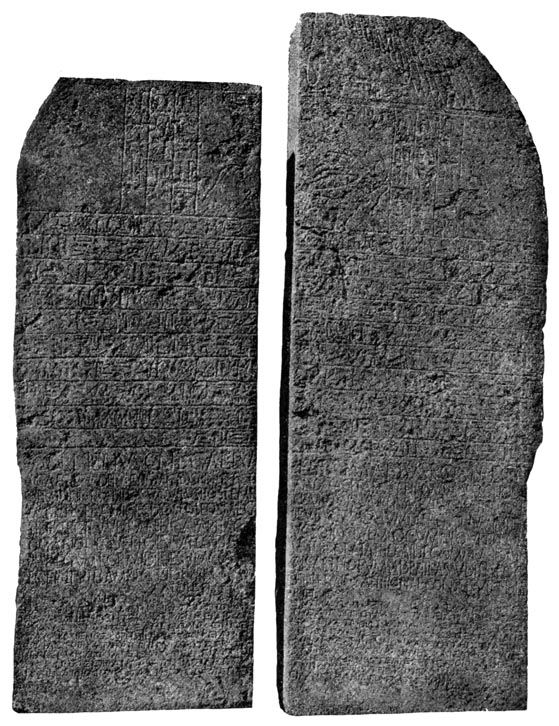
Trilingual stela of G. Cornelius Gallus from Philae (Egyptian Museum)

The first prefect of Aegyptus, Gaius Cornelius Gallus, brought Upper Egypt under Roman control by force of arms, following the Revolt of Thebes, and established a protectorate over the southern frontier district, which had been abandoned by the later Ptolemies.

The second prefect, Aelius Gallus, made an unsuccessful expedition to conquer Arabia Petraea and even Arabia Felix. The Red Sea coast of Aegyptus was not brought under Roman control until the reign of Claudius. The third prefect, Gaius Petronius, cleared the neglected canals for irrigation, stimulating a revival of agriculture. Petronius even led a campaign into present-day central Sudan against the Kingdom of Kush at Meroe, whose queen Imanarenat had previously attacked Roman Egypt. Failing to acquire permanent gains, in 22 BC he razed the city of Napata to the ground and retreated to the north.

The reigns of Tiberius, Caligula, and Claudius were mainly peaceful in Egypt, with intermittent civil strife between Greeks and Jews in Alexandria. According to the Latin historian Tacitus, Germanicus visited Egypt without the permission of Tiberius and caused a rift with his uncle, the emperor. Claudius refused Alexandrian demands for self-government under their own senate, and attempted to quell the unrest between Alexandrian Greek and Jews. Under Nero, perhaps influenced by Chaeremon of Alexandria – an Egyptian priest and the emperor's Stoic tutor – an expedition to Meroë was undertaken, though possible plans for an invasion of the southern kingdom was forestalled by the military demands of the First Jewish–Roman War, a revolt in Judaea.

The first praefectus Aegypti of Alexandrian origin was Tiberius Julius Alexander, who was governor through the Year of the Four Emperors and who eventually proclaimed the general Vespasian, victor in the Jewish War, emperor at Alexandria in July 69 AD. This prefect was himself of Hellenized Jewish descent and related to Philo of Alexandria. The importance of the Egyptian grain harvest (Latin: claustra annonae, lit. 'key to the grain supply') to Rome helped Vespasian assert control over the whole empire.

From the reign of Nero onward, Aegyptus enjoyed an era of prosperity which lasted a century. Much trouble was caused by religious conflicts between the Greeks and the Jews, particularly in Alexandria, which after the destruction of Jerusalem in 70 became the world centre of Jewish religion and culture.

Vespasian was the first emperor since Augustus to appear in Egypt. At Alexandria he was hailed as pharaoh; recalling the welcome of Alexander the Great at the Oracle of Zeus-Ammon of the Siwa Oasis, Vespasian was proclaimed the son of the creator-deity Amun (Zeus-Ammon), in the style of the ancient pharaohs, and an incarnation of Serapis in the manner of the Ptolemies. As Pharaonic precedent demanded, Vespasian demonstrated his divine election by the traditional methods of spitting on and trampling a blind and crippled man, thereby miraculously healing him. (This Egyptian tradition of healing is related to the healing the man blind from birth, one of the miracles of Jesus of Nazareth.)

In 114, during the reign of Trajan (r. 98–117), unrest among the Jews of Alexandria broke out after the coming of a Messiah was announced at Cyrene. The uprising that year was defeated, but between 115 and 117 a revolt continued in the countryside in the absence of the armies away on Trajan's Parthian campaign. This Diaspora Revolt meant that the Greeks and the Egyptian peasants took up arms in the fight against the Jews, which culminated in their defeat and the effective destruction of the Alexandrian Jewish community, which did not recover until the 3rd century. The city of Oxyrhynchus, by contrast, celebrated their survival of the rebellion with annual festivals for at least eighty years.

Hadrian and Antinous
(Graeco-Roman Museum)

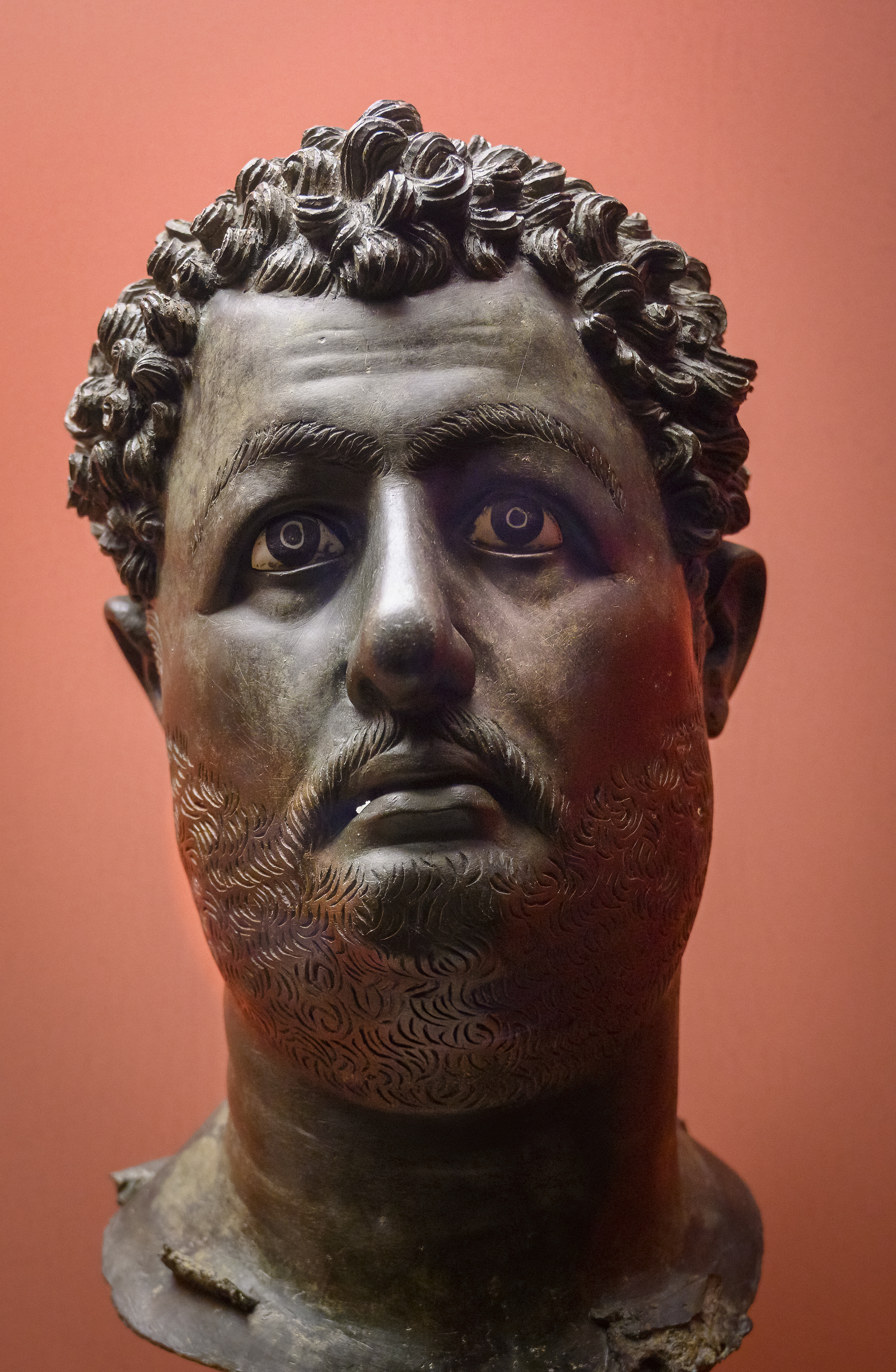
Bronze portrait head of Hadrian

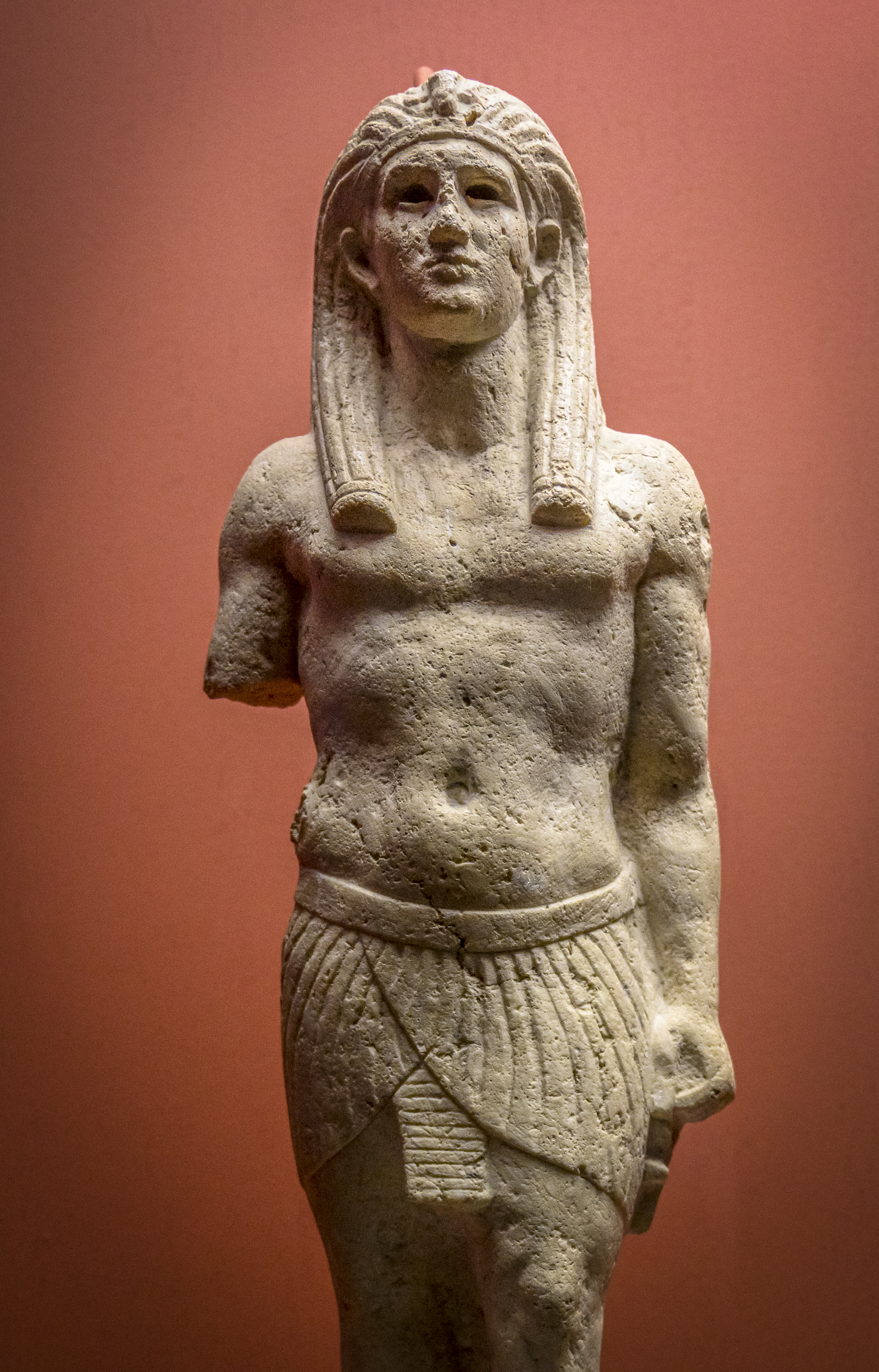
Marble statue of
Osiris-Antinous

In the reign of Trajan's successor Hadrian (r. 117–138), an Egyptian revolt was instigated on the occasion of a new Apis bull's identification in 122; this rebellion was soon suppressed. Hadrian himself toured Egypt with his court for eight to ten months in 130–131, embarking on a Nile cruise, hunting lions in the desert, and making the dawn visit to the Colossi of Memnon. Hadrian founded the city of Antinoöpolis where his lover Antinous drowned in the river; the polis joined the other three poleis as a city with Hellenic citizenship rights, and he commissioned the Via Hadriana, connecting Antinoöpolis with Berenice Troglodytica, on the Red Sea.

In 139, at the start of the reign of Antoninus Pius (r. 138–161), the Sothic cycle came to its end, meaning that for the first time in 1,460 years, the heliacal rising of Sirius coincided with the Egyptian calendar's New Year. The emperor's coinage commemorated the good fortune this was expected to portend with images of the millennial phoenix. At some time during his reign, Antoninus Pius visited Alexandria and had new gates and a new hippodrome built, but in 153, a riot in Alexandria killed the praefectus Aegypti.

The destructive Antonine Plague epidemic affected Egypt from 165 to 180; evidence of mass graves from that time has been discovered by archaeological excavation in the Valley of the Queens. A revolt of the native Egyptians from 171 was suppressed only in 175, after much fighting. This "Bucolic War", named for the native "herdsmen" (Ancient Greek: Βουκόλοι, romanized: Boukóloi, lit. 'cattlemen') was led by one Isidorus and had defeated the Roman garrison of Egypt. Control was re-established by Avidius Cassius, the governor of Roman Syria and son of an erstwhile praefectus Aegypti, who then declared himself emperor in 175, being acknowledged by his own armies and the Army of Egypt amid rumours that the emperor Marcus Aurelius (r. 161–180) was dead. On the emperor's approach, Cassius was deposed and killed after three months' rule, and the clemency of Marcus Aurelius restored peace as he visited Alexandria in 176.

Marcus Aurelius's successor Commodus (r. 176–192) overturned his adoptive father's pardon of Avidius Cassius's family by having them all murdered at the beginning of his reign. After Commodus's own murder, Pertinax was appointed emperor on 1 January 193, but this was only officially noticed in Egypt in early March, shortly before Pertinax's murder; news of this did not become known in parts of Egypt until late May. Pescennius Niger (r. 193–194), who had commanded a garrison at Aswan and the army in Syria, was recognized as the reigning emperor of Egypt by June 193, with Egypt ignoring the claims made in the brief reign of Didius Julianus at Rome.

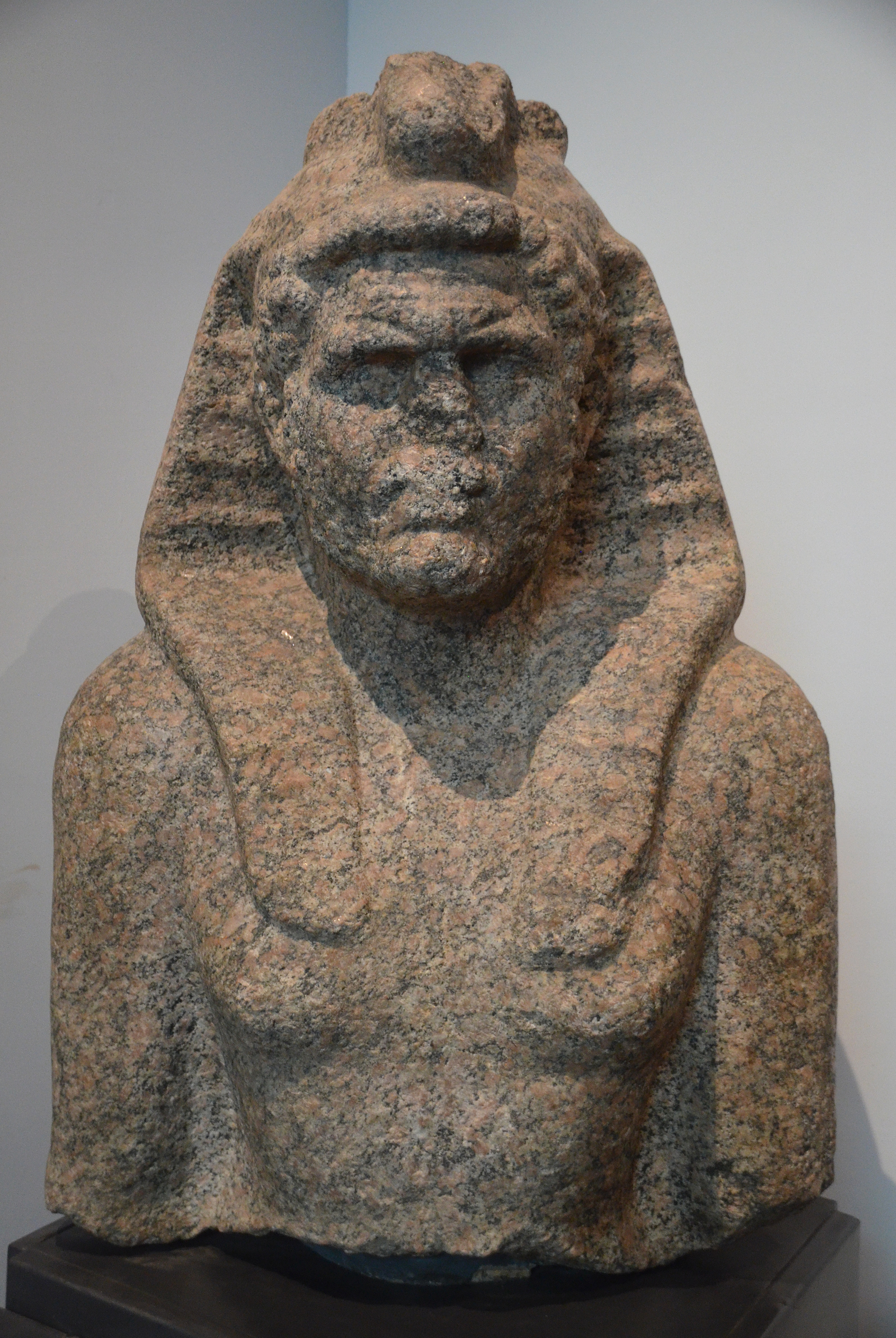
Granite statue of Caracalla wearing nemes and uraeus cobra headdress (Alexandria National Museum)

Following Hadrian's route, Septimius Severus made a tour of Egypt in 199–200, visiting the Colossi of Memnon and ordering the statues repaired, which resulted in the natural "singing" phenomenon reported by visitors to the Colossi for centuries ceasing to be heard. A series of administrative reforms, probably intended to improve revenue collection, included a new boulē (a local council or senate) for Alexandria, and for the mētropolis of each nome, instituted in 200/201.

Caracalla (r. 198–217) granted Roman citizenship to all Egyptians, in common with the other provincials, with the 212 Constitutio Antoniniana. As a consequence, many Egyptians adopted the emperor's nomen gentilicium, "Aurelius" (after his imperial predecessor Marcus Aurelius) as their name according to Roman naming conventions, though citizenship's entitlements were less valuable than in past centuries and carried a tax burden. Caracalla murdered his brother and co-augustus Geta not long after their father's death, claiming self-defence and imposing a damnatio memoriae; this excuse and other defects of the emperor's character were mocked by the Alexandrians as he approached Egypt in 215, angering Caracalla. The emperor massacred Alexandria's welcoming delegation and allowed his army to sack the city; afterwards, he barred Egyptians from entering the place (except where for religious or trade reasons) and increased its security.

Macrinus (r. 217–218), having assassinated Caracalla, assumed power and dispatched a new praefectus Aegypti and, breaking precedent, a senator to govern Egypt. When the deaths of Macrinus and his co-augustus Diadumenian (r. 218) after the Battle of Antioch were announced in Alexandria, the Alexandrians rose up, killed the senator, and forced out the prefect. The victor in the civil war was Elagabalus (r. 218–222), himself succeeded by Severus Alexander (r. 218–222) after the former's murder, but even though Severus Alexander may have visited Alexandria, neither emperor is much recorded in Egyptian sources.

After Decius died, Trebonianus Gallus (r. 251–253) was recognized as emperor; in 253 an embassy from Meroë to the Romans is attested from a graffito carved at Philae. Both Trebonianus Gallus and Aemilianus (r. 253) had coins issued in their names at Alexandria. During the reigns of Valerian (r. 253–260) and his son Gallienus (r. 253–268), the empire's instability was compounded by the Valerianic Persecution and the unprecedented total defeat and capture of Valerian by the Sasanian Empire's Shapur I (r. 240–270) at the 260 Battle of Edessa. After this humiliation, the army acclaimed the brothers Quietus and Macrianus (r. 260–261) augusti; they were the acknowledged emperors in Egypt. When they were overthrown, the Alexandrians acclaimed Lucius Mussius Aemilianus, the praefectus Aegypti as their new emperor. He enjoyed successes against the Blemmyes attacking the Thebaid, but by August 262 Alexandria was devastated and had lost two thirds of its inhabitants amid street fighting between the loyalists of Aemilianus and Gallienus; Aemilianus was defeated.

There was a series of revolts, both military and civilian, through the 3rd century. Under Decius, in 250, the Christians again suffered from persecution, but their religion continued to spread. The prefect of Aegyptus in 260, Mussius Aemilianus, first supported the Macriani, usurpers during the rule of Gallienus, and later, in 261, became a usurper himself, but was defeated by Gallienus.

During the existence of the break-away Palmyrene Empire, Egypt came under the rule of Zenobia. Under her control, the Palmyrene state went to war with Rome, holding Egypt against Aurelian (r. 270–275); his forces, led by his eventual successor Probus (r. 276–282), captured Egypt by the end of 271. In 272 however, both Alexandria and Palmyra were again in revolt, at the instigation of Firmus, an Alexandrian with connections to the Blemmyes. Aurelian besieged Alexandria and Firmus killed himself. The reign of Aurelian's successor Marcus Claudius Tacitus (r. 275–276) left no known surviving mark on Egypt, and his brother Florianus (r. 276) was overthrown by Probus with the support of the Army of Egypt. The Blemmyes attacked Coptos and Ptolemais with incursions into Upper Egypt; Probus defeated them.

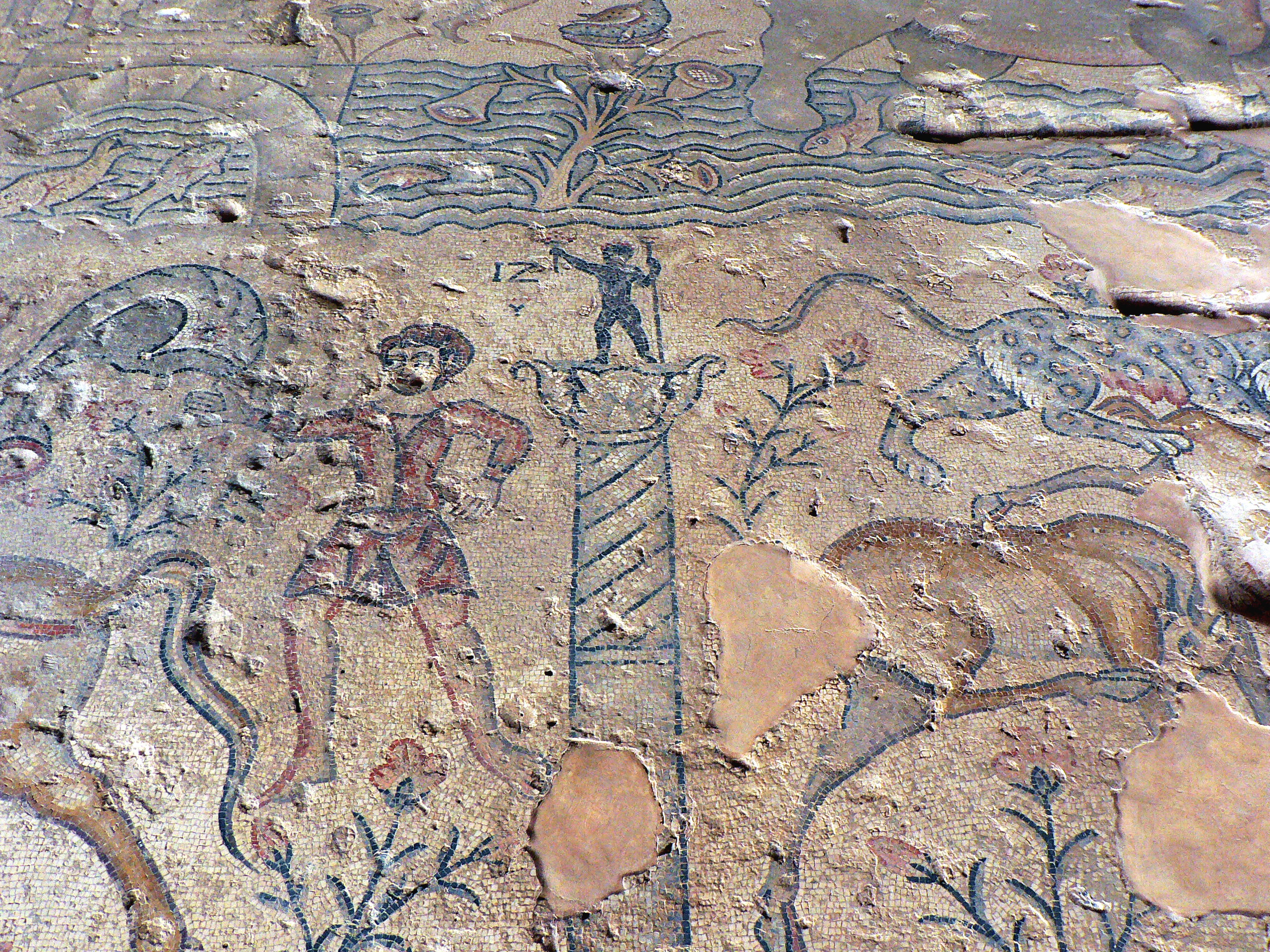
"Pompey's Pillar", a monument erected by Diocletian (r. 284–305) in the Serapeum of Alexandria, represented in a mosaic from Sepphoris in Roman Palestine

=== Later antique Egypt (4th–7th centuries) ===
Coptos revolted in 293 and was destroyed by the augustus Diocletian's caesar (junior co-emperor) and future successor, Galerius (r. 293–311). Diocletian's reforms subdivided the empire into more numerous late Roman provinces; these were grouped into thirteen Roman dioceses, and these into four praetorian prefectures. The old province of Aegyptus was divided, with the Thebaid becoming its own province. Financial and tax reforms were implemented in Egypt in 297, and Egyptian currency was brought into line with the rest of the empire's monetary reforms. The role of the praefectus Aegypti was divided between a praeses – a civilian governor – and a military dux.

In 297, Domitius Domitianus led a revolt and made himself emperor, assisted by Achilleus. Diocletian captured Alexandria from them after an eight-month siege and "Pompey's Pillar" was erected in his honour in the Serapeum of Alexandria. Diocletian then travelled through Egypt as far as Philae, where new gates were constructed for the occasion. Diocletian is also known to have visited Panopolis in 298. He ceded the Dodekaschoinos, upstream of the First Cataract in Lower Nubia, to the Noba people, who were subsidized by the Romans to defend the frontier, now at Syene (Aswan), from attack by the Blemmyes. Diocletian's second visit to Egypt, in 302, involved distributions of bread to the Alexandrians and actions taken against adherents of Manichaeism; the following year, Diocletian instituted the Diocletianic Persecution against Christianity. The persecution was remembered as particularly intense under Satrius Arrianus and Sossianus Hierocles, the praefecti between 304 and 307 and in 310 respectively. The Edict of Serdica published by Galerius, the senior emperor in 311, ended the Diocletianic Persecution.

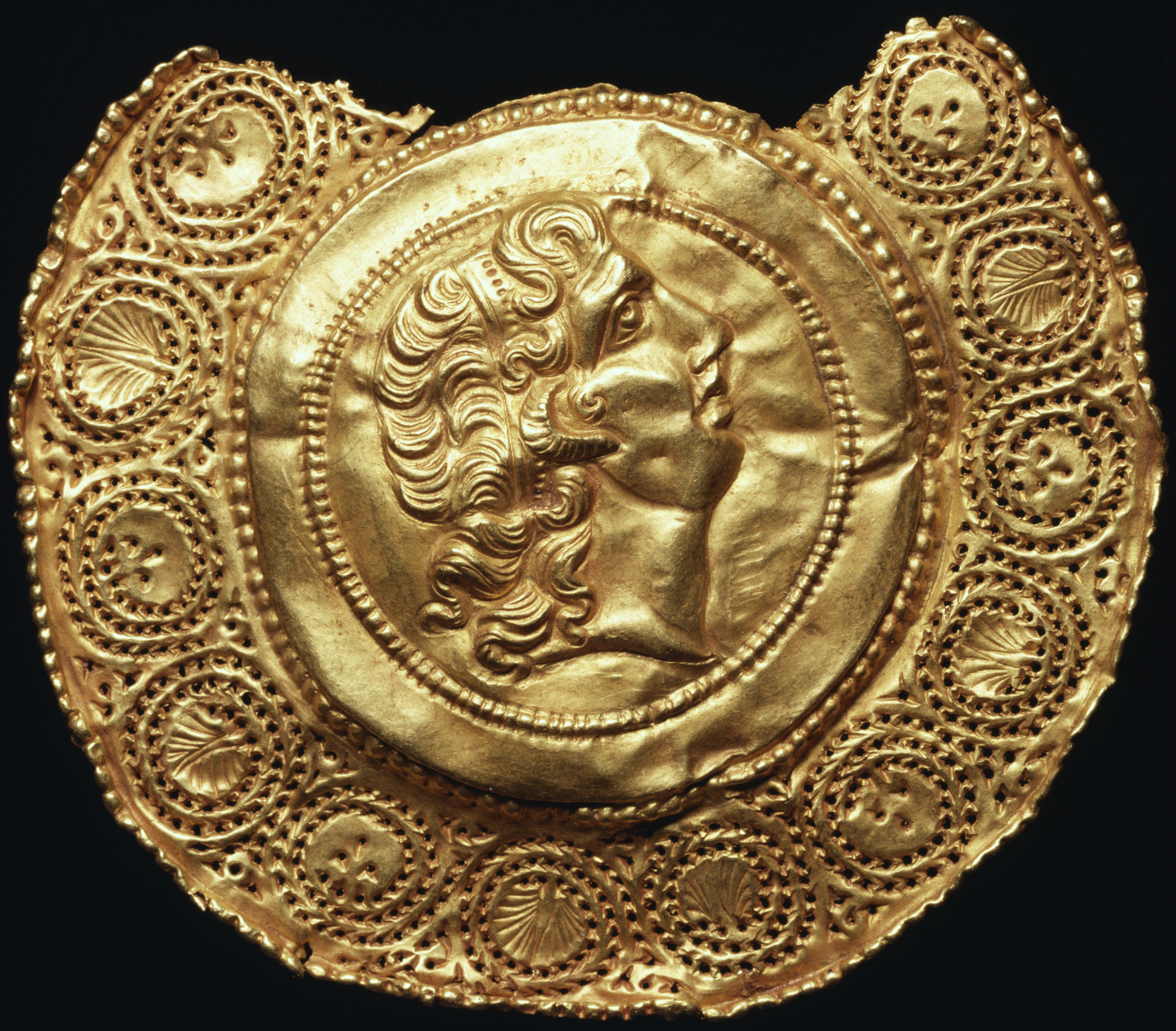
4th-century pendant with portrait of Alexander the Great as Zeus-Ammon with repoussé border (Walters Art Museum)

In 313, having defeated their rivals, the co-augusti Licinius (r. 308–324) and Constantine the Great (r. 306–337) issued their Edict of Milan, giving Christianity official recognition among the Romans' other religions. The tax system was reformed, and new fifteen-year cycles (back-dated to 312) of indictions were instituted for revenue purposes. The former soldier Pachomius the Great was baptized into Christianity in 313. Constantine may have planned a visit to Egypt in 325, since preparations were made for an imperial reception at Oxyrhynchus, but these plans would have been forestalled by the convocation of the Christian First Council of Nicaea. The Nicene Creed united most of the Christian Church against the Arianism promoted by the Egyptian bishop Arius and in favour of the doctrines of another Egyptian bishop, Athanasius of Alexandria. In 330, the Christian monastic Macarius of Egypt established his monastery at Scetis (Wadi El Natrun) in the Nitrian Desert.

On 24 February 391, the emperor Theodosius the Great (r. 379–395), in the names of himself and his co-augusti (his brother-in-law Valentinian II (r. 375–392) and his own son Arcadius (r. 383–408)) banned sacrifices and worship at temples throughout the empire in a decree addressed to Rome's praefectus urbi. On 16 June, writing to the praefectus augustalis and the comes Aegypti, Theodosius and his imperial colleagues reissued the ban on temple worship and sacrifices for Alexandria and Egypt specifically.

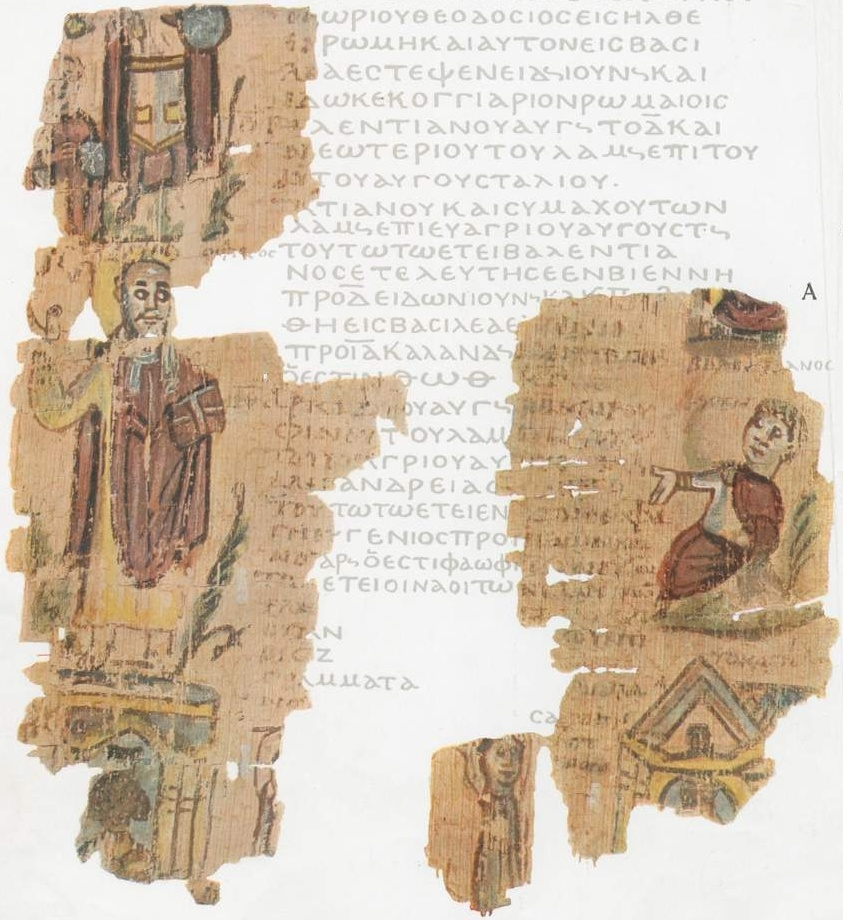
Folio 6 verso from the Golenischev papyrus of the Alexandrian World Chronicle, showing Theophilus of Alexandria standing triumphantly on top of the Serapeum with its bust of Serapis

Unrest was fomented against the pagan inhabitants by the bishop, Theophilus of Alexandria, who provoked riots by attempting to convert a temple into a church and staging the discovery of Christian relics. These were processed through the streets and the pagans were forced to take refuge in the Serapeum, with the philosopher Olympius at their head. The Christian mob loyal to Theophilus sacked the Serapeum, and ultimately it was rededicated as a church to John the Baptist. The Serapeum of Canopus (Abu Qir) was looted at the same time, becoming first a monastery and then a church dedicated to Cyrus and John. Ammonius Grammaticus – a priest of Thoth – and the Alexandrian poet Claudian both subsequently fled Egypt, for Constantinople and Rome respectively.

Arcadius' son and successor Theodosius II's long reign (r. 402–450) saw the unrest generated by the bishop Cyril of Alexandria; he was opposed to the doctrines of Nestorius, bishop of Constantinople, in relation to the title Mother of God (Theotokos). The faction of Cyril, aided by Shenoute, prevailed, and Nestorius, having been denounced at the 431 Council of Ephesus, was banished in 435 to the Kharga Oasis in the Western Desert. The see of Alexandria's bishop reached the zenith of its influence in 449, when under Dioscorus I (r. 444–454/458) it successfully defended the doctrines of Eutyches at the Second Council of Ephesus against the positions of Dioscorus' rival bishops, Leo I of Rome and Flavian of Constantinople.

The Blemmyes continued to attack Roman Egypt, though they were romanticized by pagans for their resistance to the Christians. Olympiodorus of Thebes wrote a positive account of them after a visit in c. 425. In 451, the emperor Marcian (r. 450–457) arrived at a peace treaty with the Blemmyes which allowed them the use of the temple at Philae annually and permitted them to use (and return) the temples' cult statues for oracular purposes.

Marcian however, convened the 451 Council of Chalcedon, overturning the conclusions of the Second Council of Ephesus, condemning Dioscorus and sending him into exile. The resultant, and lasting, schism between the Coptic Church and the state church of the Roman Empire dates from this time. Proterius was appointed bishop in Dioscorus' stead. When the Alexandrians heard of the accession of Marcian's successor Leo I, they tore apart the hated Proterius and replaced him with their own nomination, Timothy II, whose election was not recognized by either Leo or his successor and son-in-law Zeno. When Leo's brother-in-law Basiliscus seized Zeno's throne in 475, his miaphysitism enabled a thaw in relations between Alexandria and the eastern imperial capital, but Zeno's recovery of Constantinople the following year resumed the hostility. Zeno's attempt to repair relations between Rome, Constantinople and Alexandria resulted in his own excommunication by the bishop of Rome, Felix III, and beginning the Acacian schism.

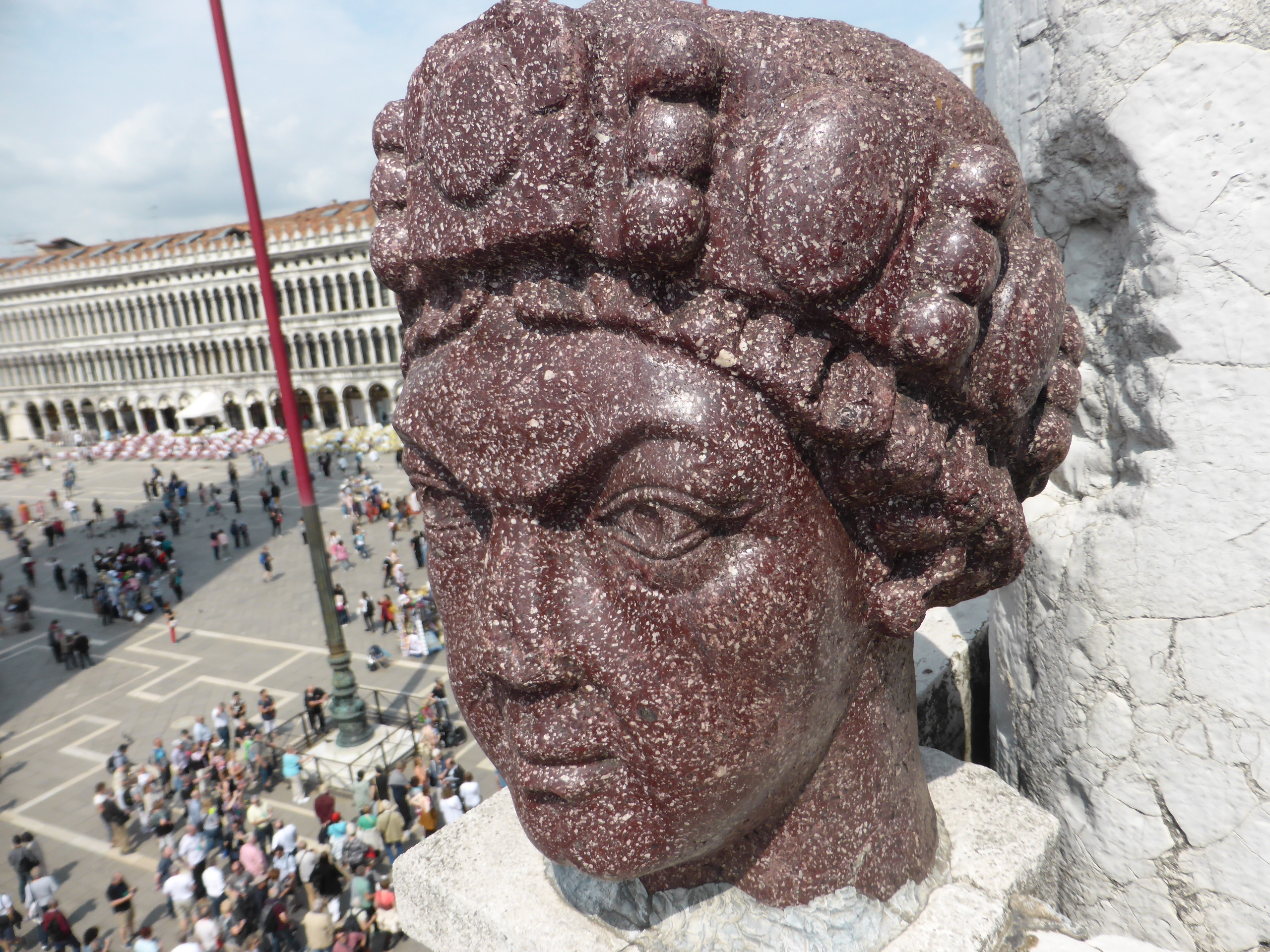
The Carmagnola, an Egyptian porphyry head on Venice's St Mark's Basilica thought to represent Justinian I

The Sasanian Empire invaded the Nile Delta in the reign of Anastasius I (r. 491–518), though the Sasanian army retreated after they failed to capture Alexandria or make significant gains. In the early 6th century and in the reign of Justin I (r. 518–527), the Blemmyes again made attacks on Upper Egypt. Justin's successor Justinian I (r. 527–565) and his wife, the augusta Theodora, both sought to convert the Noba to Christianity; envoys of Justinian promoted dyophysitism but the Noba were persuaded to adopt the miaphysitism of the Coptic Church by emissaries of the empress. Newly converted, they assisted the Roman army in its conquest of the pagan Blemmyes, and the general Narses was in 543 sent to confiscate the cult statues of Philae (which were sent to Constantinople), close the temple, and suppress its priesthood by imprisonment. In 577, during the retirement of Justinian's successor Justin II (r. 565–574) and the start of Tiberius II Constantine's reign (r. 574–582), the defences at Philae had to be rebuilt to repel attacks by the Blemmyes.

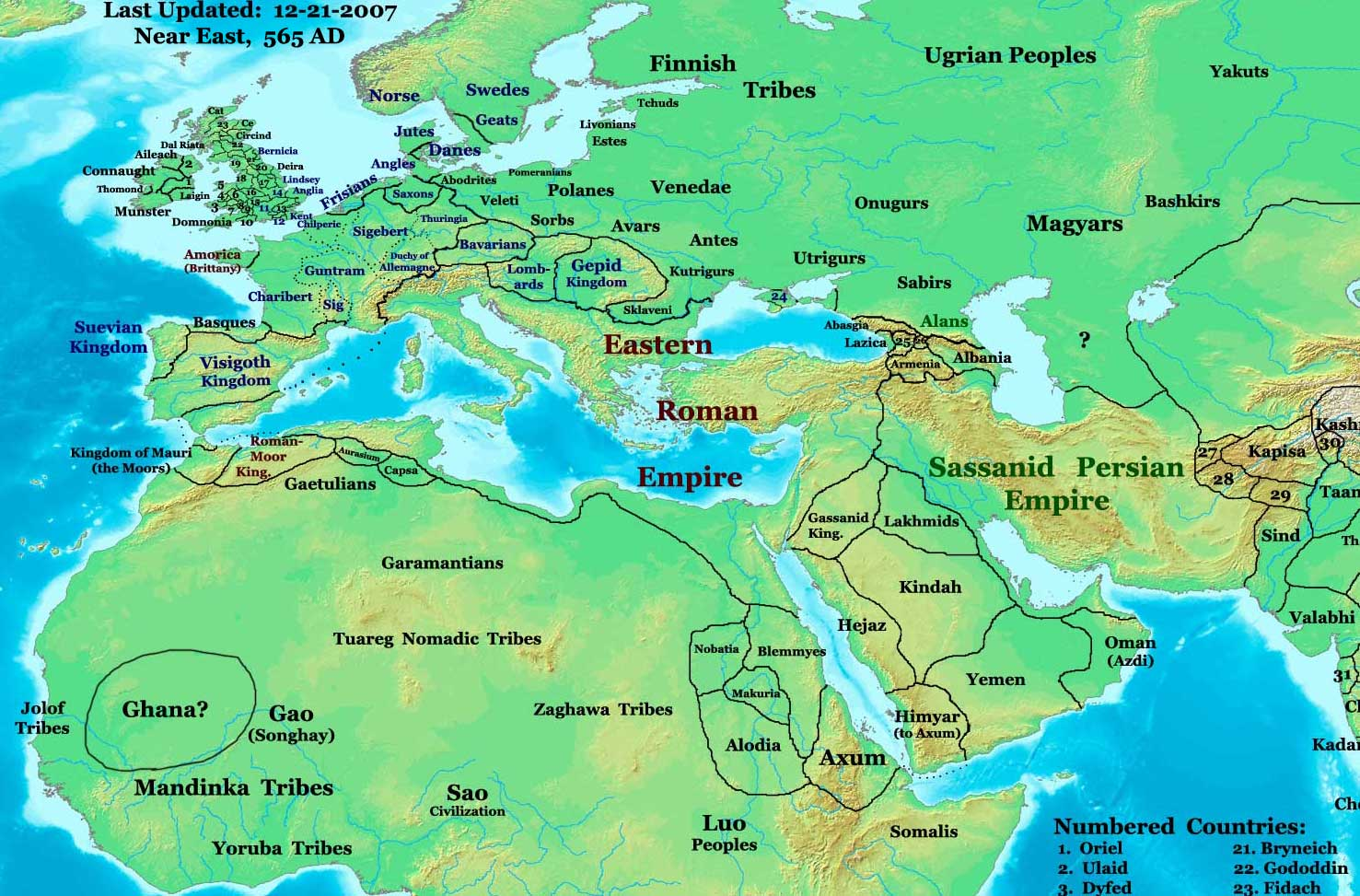
A map of the Near East in 565, showing Byzantine Egypt and its neighbors.

The reign of Constantine the Great also saw the founding of Constantinople as a new capital for the Roman Empire, and in the course of the 4th century, the Empire was divided in two, with Egypt finding itself in the Eastern Empire with its capital at Constantinople. Latin, never well established in Egypt, would play a declining role with Greek continuing to be the dominant language of government and scholarship. During the 5th and 6th centuries the Eastern Roman Empire, known historiographically as the Byzantine Empire, gradually transformed itself into a thoroughly Christian state whose culture differed significantly from its pagan past.

The Eastern Empire became increasingly "oriental" in style as its links with the old Græco-Roman world faded. The Greek system of local government by citizens had now entirely disappeared. Offices, with new Greek-Byzantine names, were almost hereditary in the wealthy land-owning families. Alexandria, the second city of the empire, continued to be a centre of religious controversy and violence.

Egypt nevertheless continued to be an important economic center for the Empire supplying much of its agriculture and manufacturing needs as well as continuing to be an important center of scholarship. It would supply the needs of the Byzantine Empire and the Mediterranean as a whole. The reign of Justinian (527–565) saw the Empire recapture Rome and much of Italy from the barbarians, but these successes left the empire's eastern flank exposed. The Empire's "bread basket" now lacked protection.

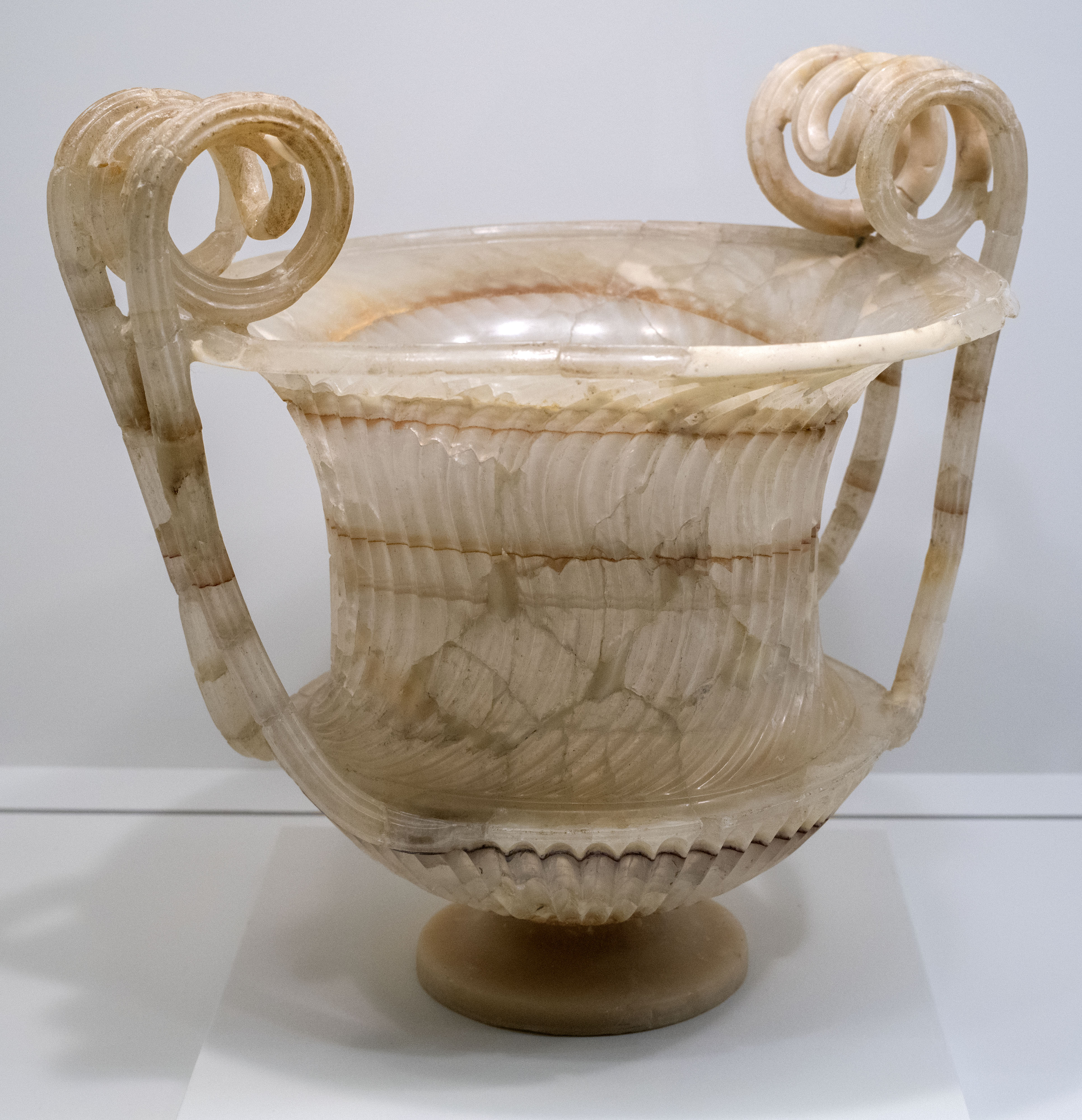
Augustan-era krater in Egyptian alabaster, found in a Roman necropolis at San Prisco in 1897 (National Archaeological Museum, Naples)

==== Episcopal sees ====
Ancient episcopal sees of the Roman province of Aegyptus Primus (I) listed in the Annuario Pontificio as titular sees, suffragans of the Patriarchate of Alexandria are enumerated in the following. The list here, however, does not cover other provinces such as Augustamnica, Arcadia and Thebais.

- Agnus
- Andropolis (Khirbita)
- Butus (near Desuq? Com-Casir?)
- Cleopatris (Seresna)
- Coprithis (Qabrit)
- Hermopolis Parva
- Letopolis (Ausim)
- Phatanus (El-Batanu, El-Batnu)
- Mariotes (Lake Mariout)
- Menelaite (Idku)
- Metelis (Fuwwah)
- Naucratis (An Nuqrash)
- Nicius (Zawyat Razin)
- Onouphis (Minuf)
- Petra in Aegypto (Hagar-En-Nauatiyeh)
- Sais (San Al Hajar)
- Taua (Thaouah? near Ebiar?)
- Terenuthis (Al Tarranah)
- Thois (Tideh)

Ancient episcopal sees of the Roman province of Aegyptus Secundus (II) listed in the Annuario Pontificio as titular sees :

- Busiris (Abu-Sir)
- Cabasa (Chahbas-Esch-Choada)
- Cynopolis in Aegypto (Banâm Benâ)
- *Diospolis Inferior (*Tell el-Balamun)
- Pachnemunis (Kom el-Khanziri)
- Phragonis (Tell-El-Faraïn, Côm-Faraïn)
- Schedia
- Sebennytus (Sebennytos)
- Xois

=== Sassanian Persian invasion (619 AD) ===
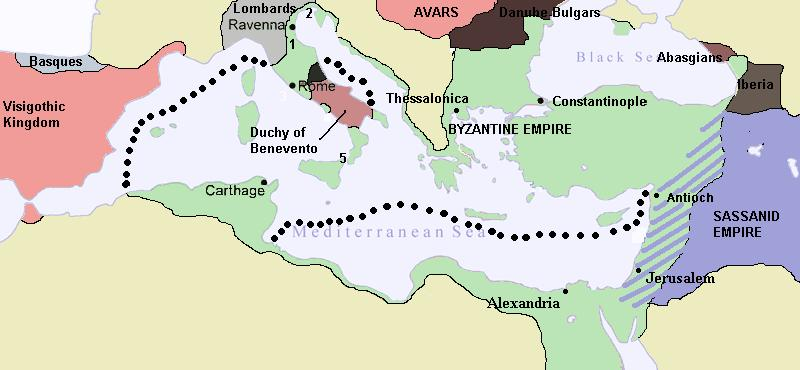
The Byzantine Empire in 629 after Heraclius had reconquered Syria, Palestine and Egypt from the Sassanid Empire.

The Sasanian conquest of Egypt, beginning in AD 618 or 619, was one of the last Sassanid triumphs in the Roman-Persian Wars against Roman Empire. From 619 to 628, they incorporated Egypt once again within their territories, the previous longer time being under the Achaemenids. Khosrow II Parvêz had begun this war on the pretext of retaliation for the assassination of Emperor Maurice (582–602) and had achieved a series of early successes, culminating in the conquests of Jerusalem (614) and Alexandria (619).

A Byzantine counteroffensive launched by Emperor Heraclius in the spring of 622 shifted the advantage, and the war was brought to an end by the fall of Khosrow on 25 February 628. The Egyptians had no love of the emperor in Constantinople and put up little resistance. Khosrow's son and successor, Kavadh II Šêrôe (Šêrôy), who reigned until September, concluded a peace treaty returning territories conquered by the Sassanids to the Eastern Roman Empire.

The Sassanian conquest allowed Miaphysitism to resurface in the open in Egypt, and when imperial rule was restored by Emperor Heraclius in 629, the Miaphysites were persecuted and their patriarch expelled. Egypt was thus in a state of both religious and political alienation from the Empire when a new invader appeared.

=== Arab Islamic conquest (639–646 AD) ===
The Mediterranean world in 650, after the Arabs had conquered Egypt and Syria from the Byzantines.

An army of 4,000 Arabs led by Amr Ibn Al-Aas was sent by the Caliph Umar, successor to Muhammad, to spread Islamic rule to the west. Arabs crossed into Egypt from Palestine in December 639, and advanced rapidly into the Nile Delta. The Imperial garrisons retreated into the walled towns, where they successfully held out for a year or more.

The Arabs sent for reinforcements, and in April 641 they besieged Alexandria. Following a brief truce, the imperial forces retreated, ending 671 years of Roman government. (Note: Alexandria was conquered by Augustus on 1 August 30 BC; the last Roman forces departed on 17 September 642.) The Byzantines assembled a fleet with the aim of recapturing Egypt, and briefly won back Alexandria in late 645. However, the Muslims retook the city in 646, completing the Muslim conquest of Egypt. 40,000 civilians were evacuated to Constantinople with the imperial fleet.

== Gallery ==
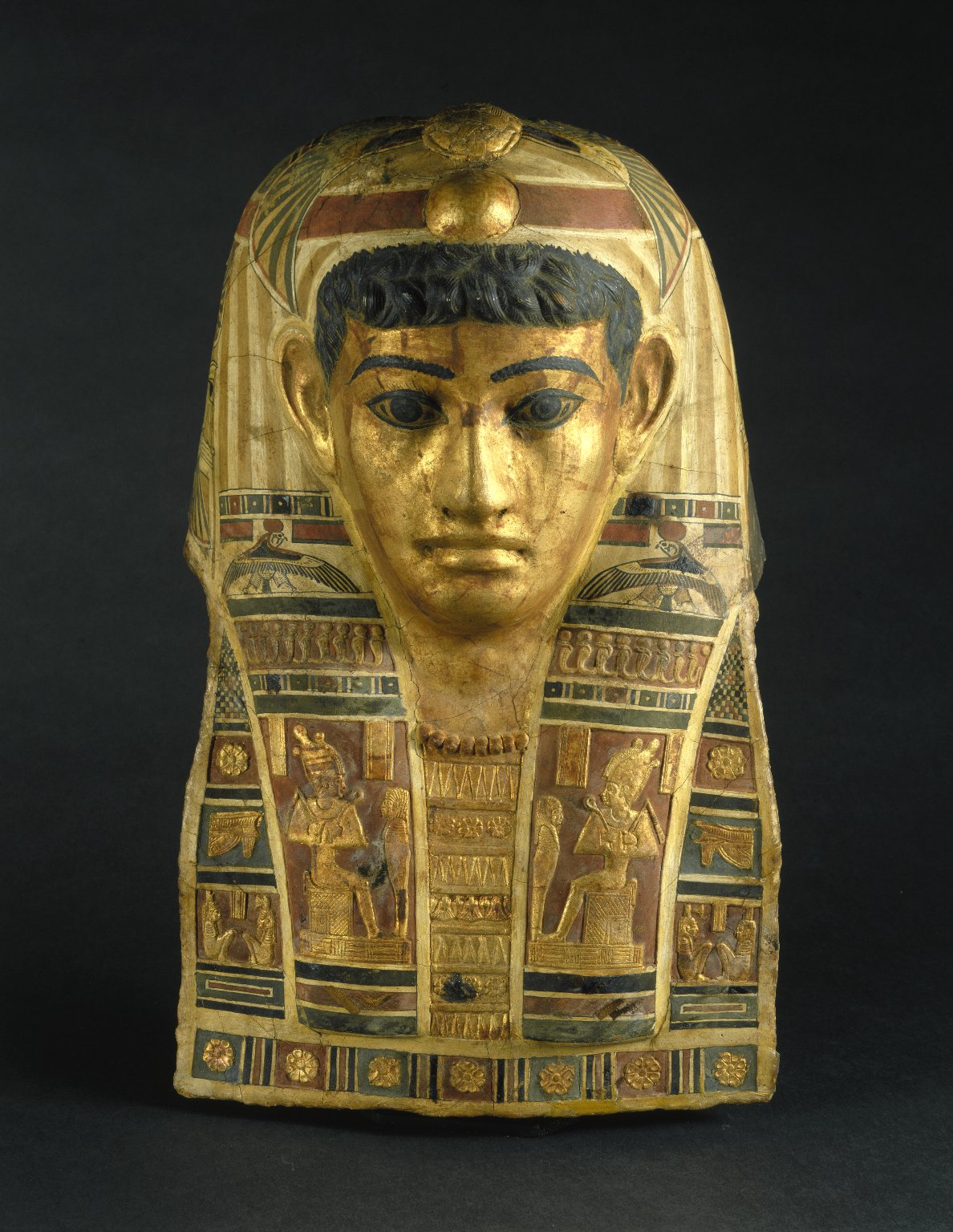
Mummy Mask of a Man, early 1st century AD, 72.57, Brooklyn Museum

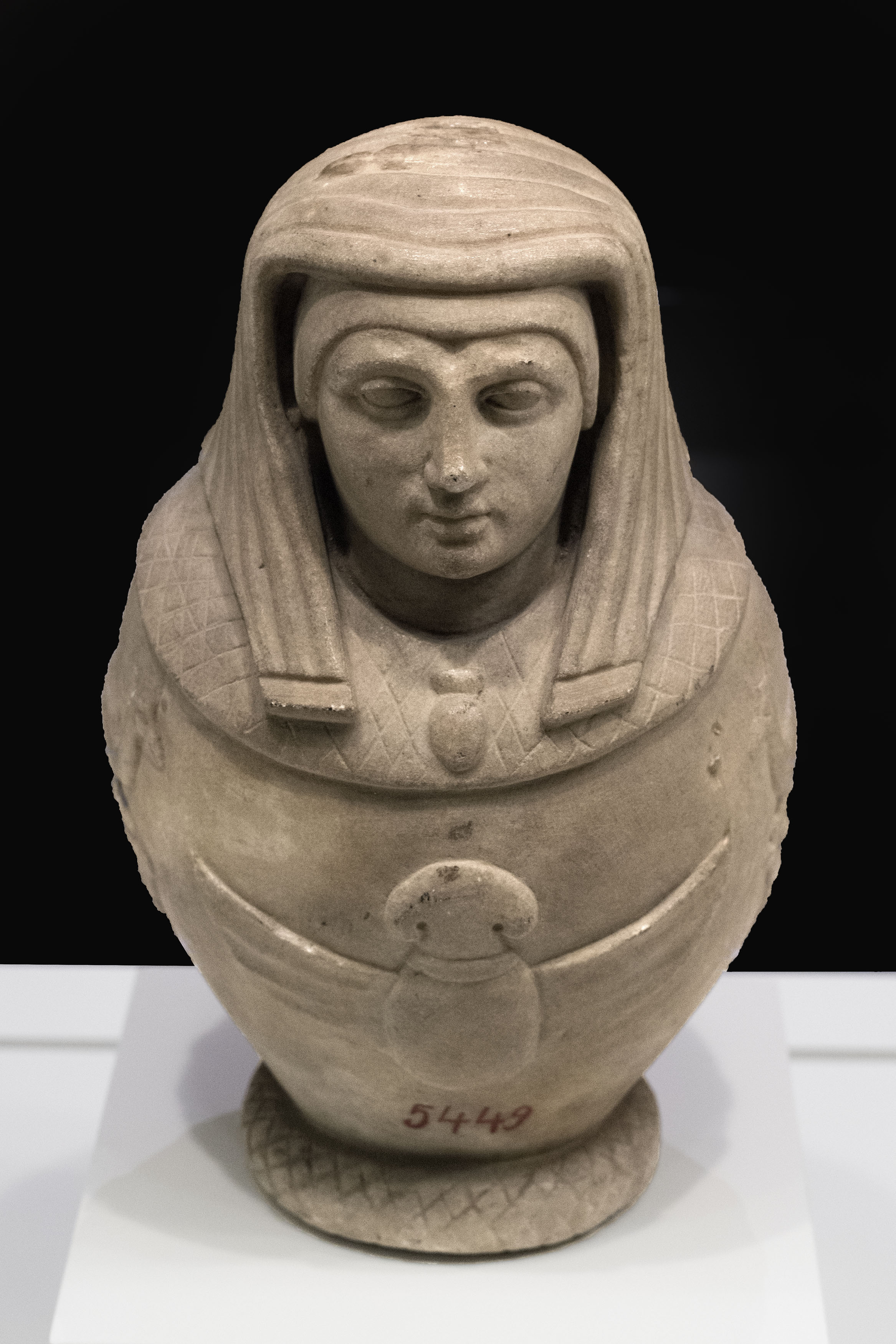
Canopic jar from the 3rd or 4th century (National Archaeological Museum, Florence)

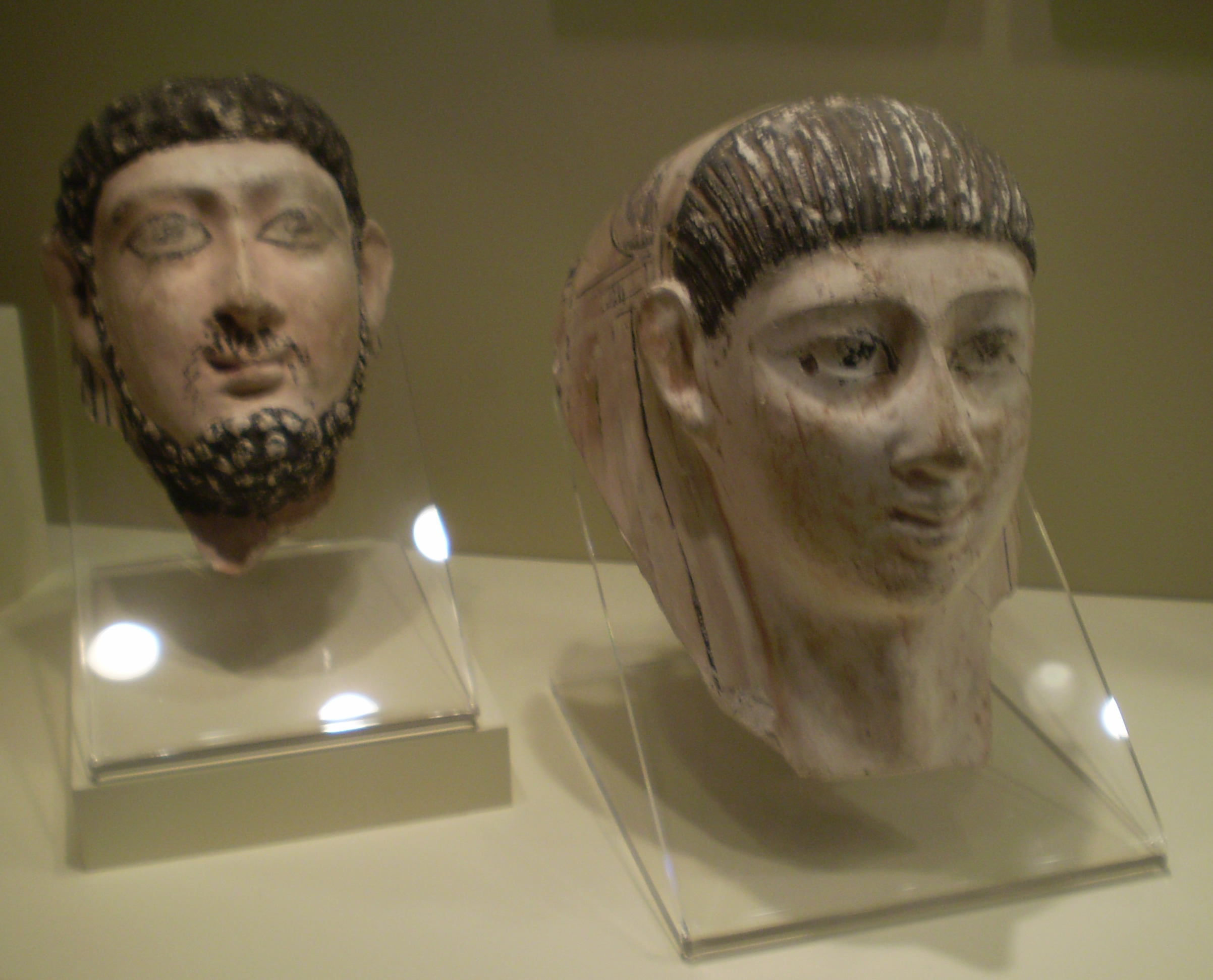
Funerary masks uncovered in Faiyum, 1st century.

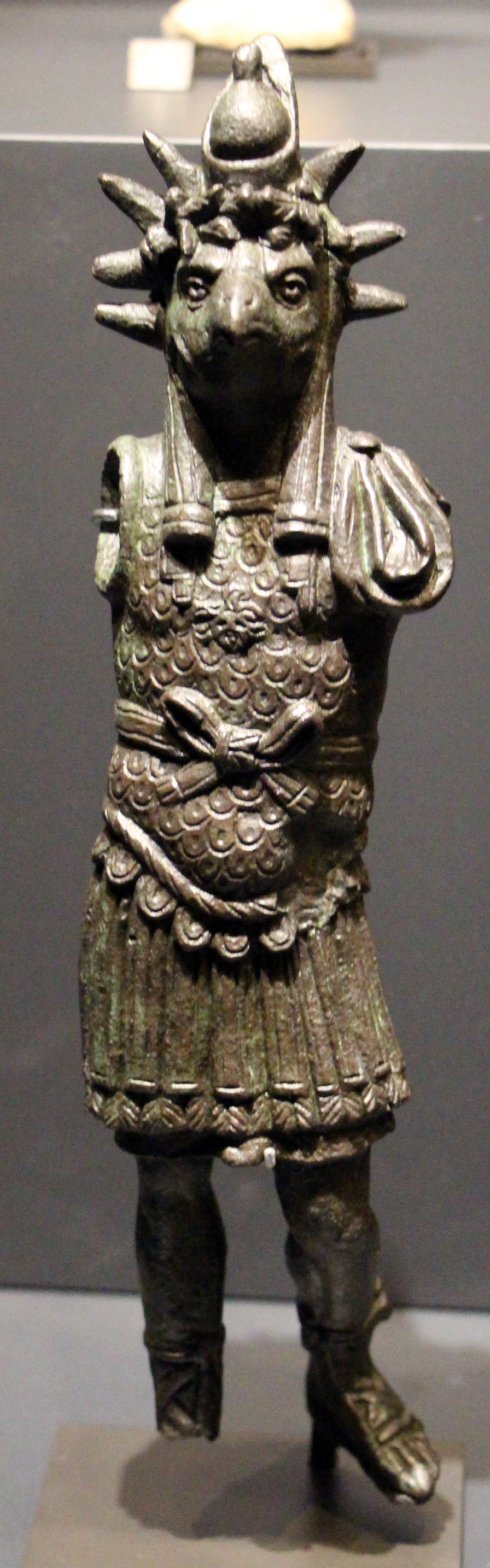
2nd-century statuette of Horus as Roman general (Louvre)

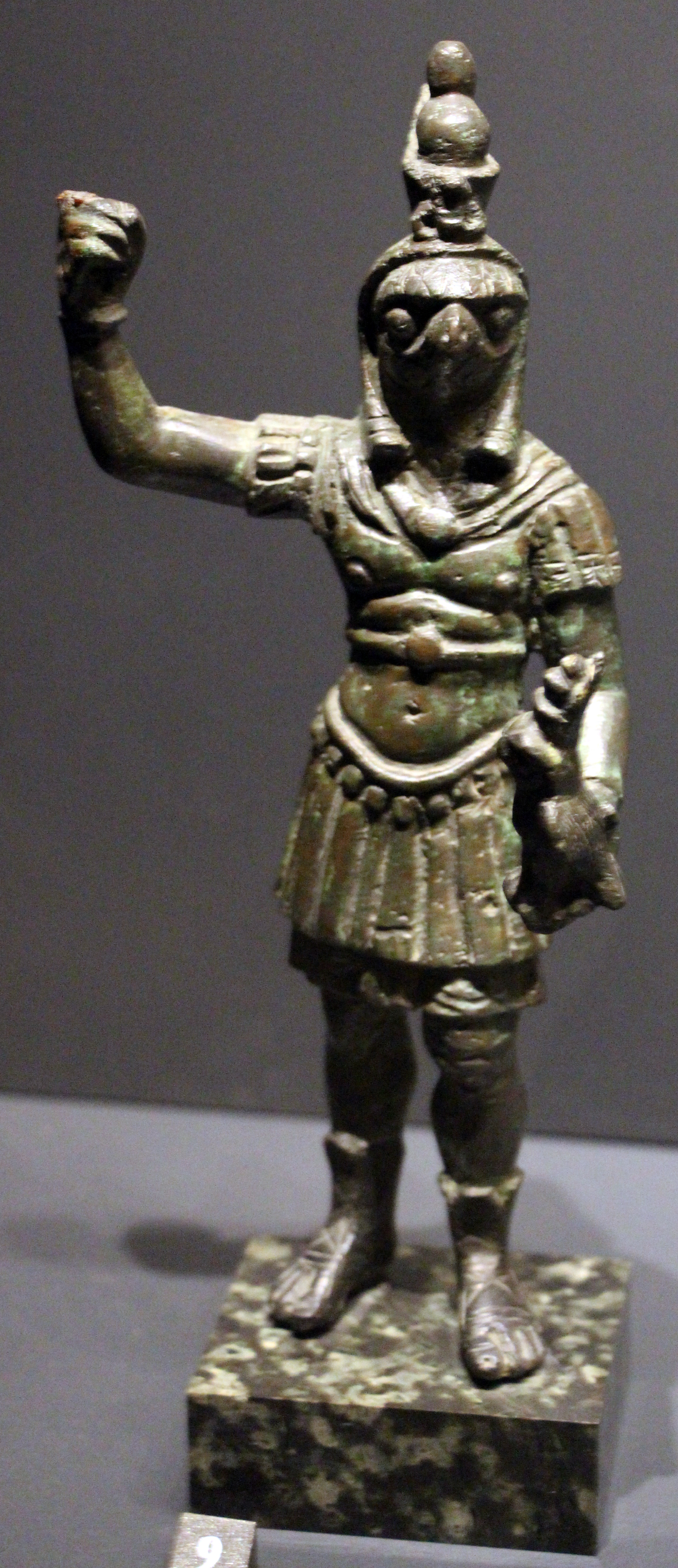
1st–4th-century statuette of Horus as a Roman soldier (Louvre)

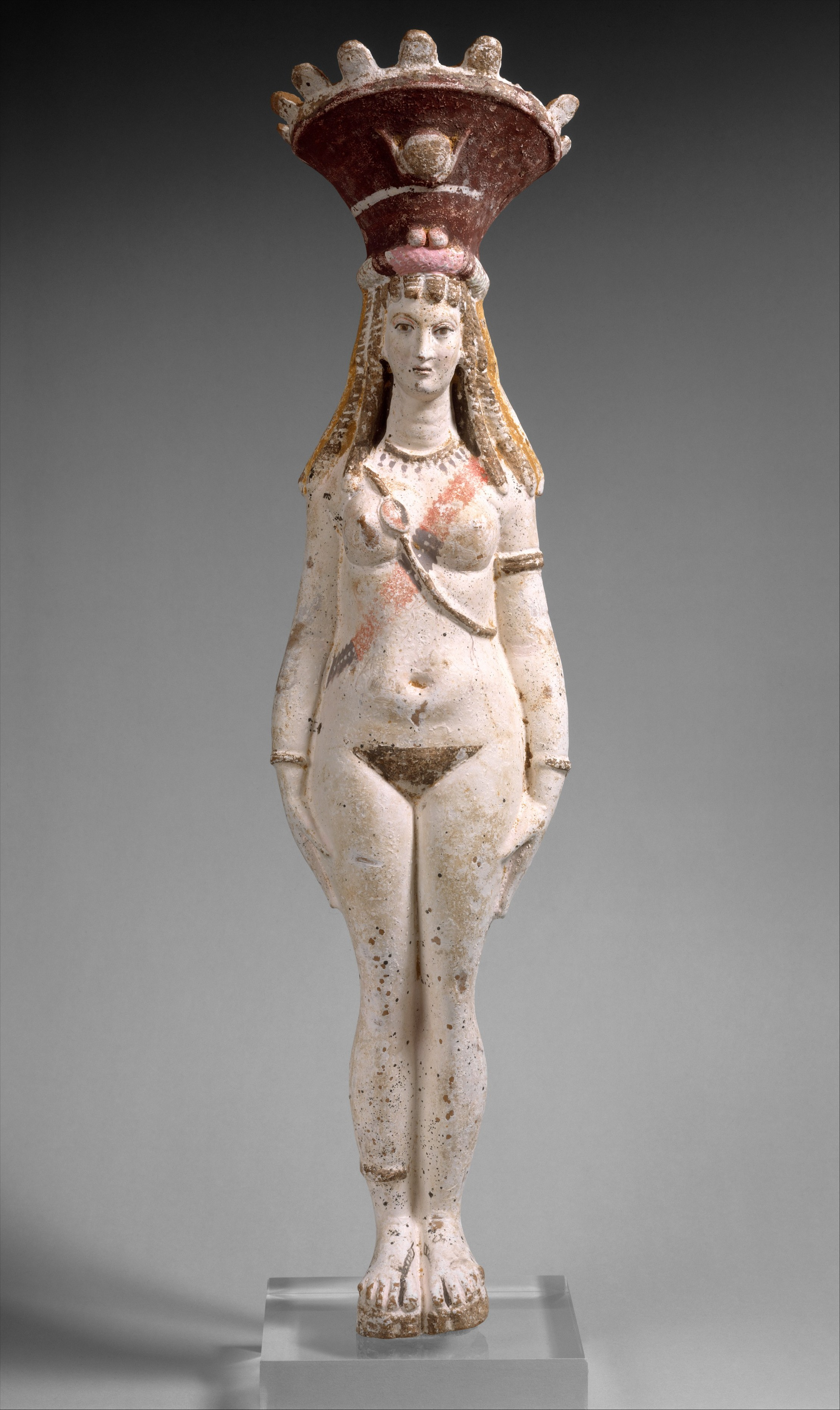
2nd-century statuette of Isis–Aphrodite (Metropolitan Museum of Art)

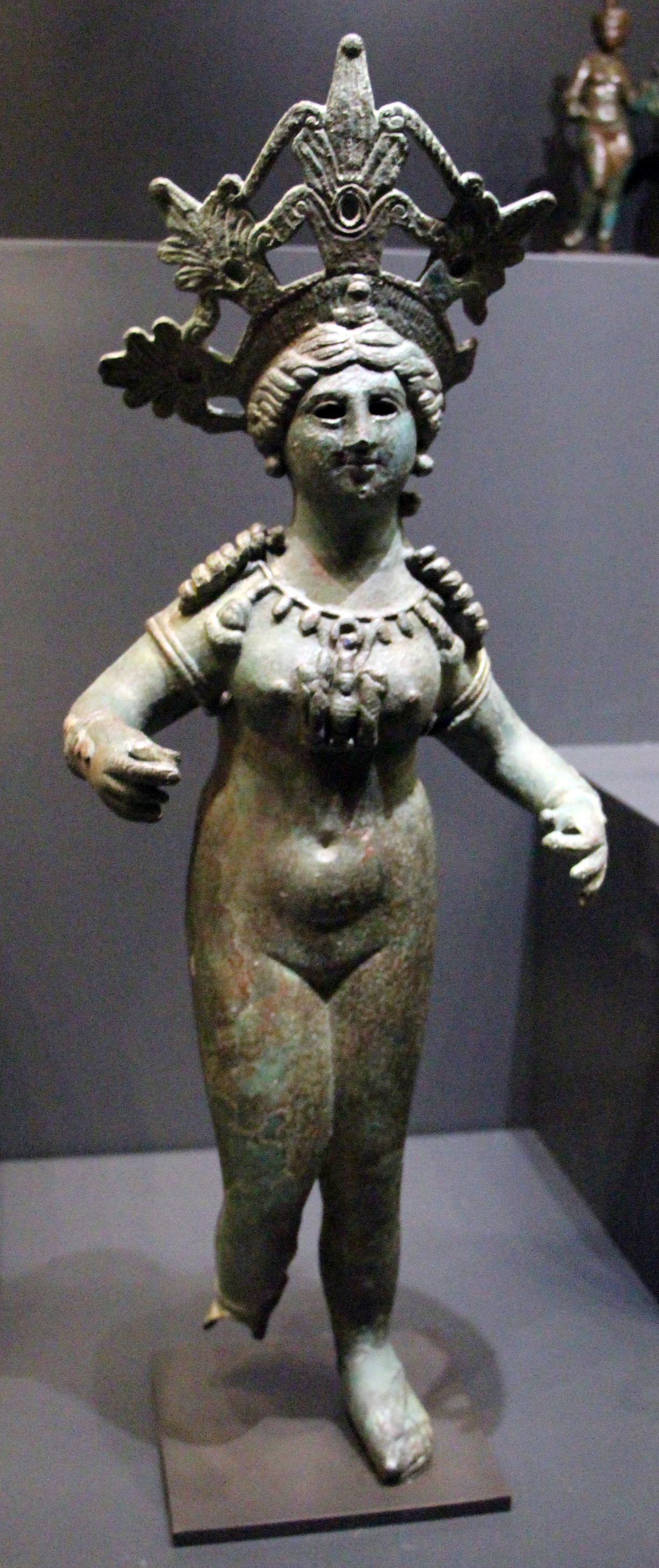
2nd-century statuette of Isis–Aphrodite from Lower Egypt (Louvre)

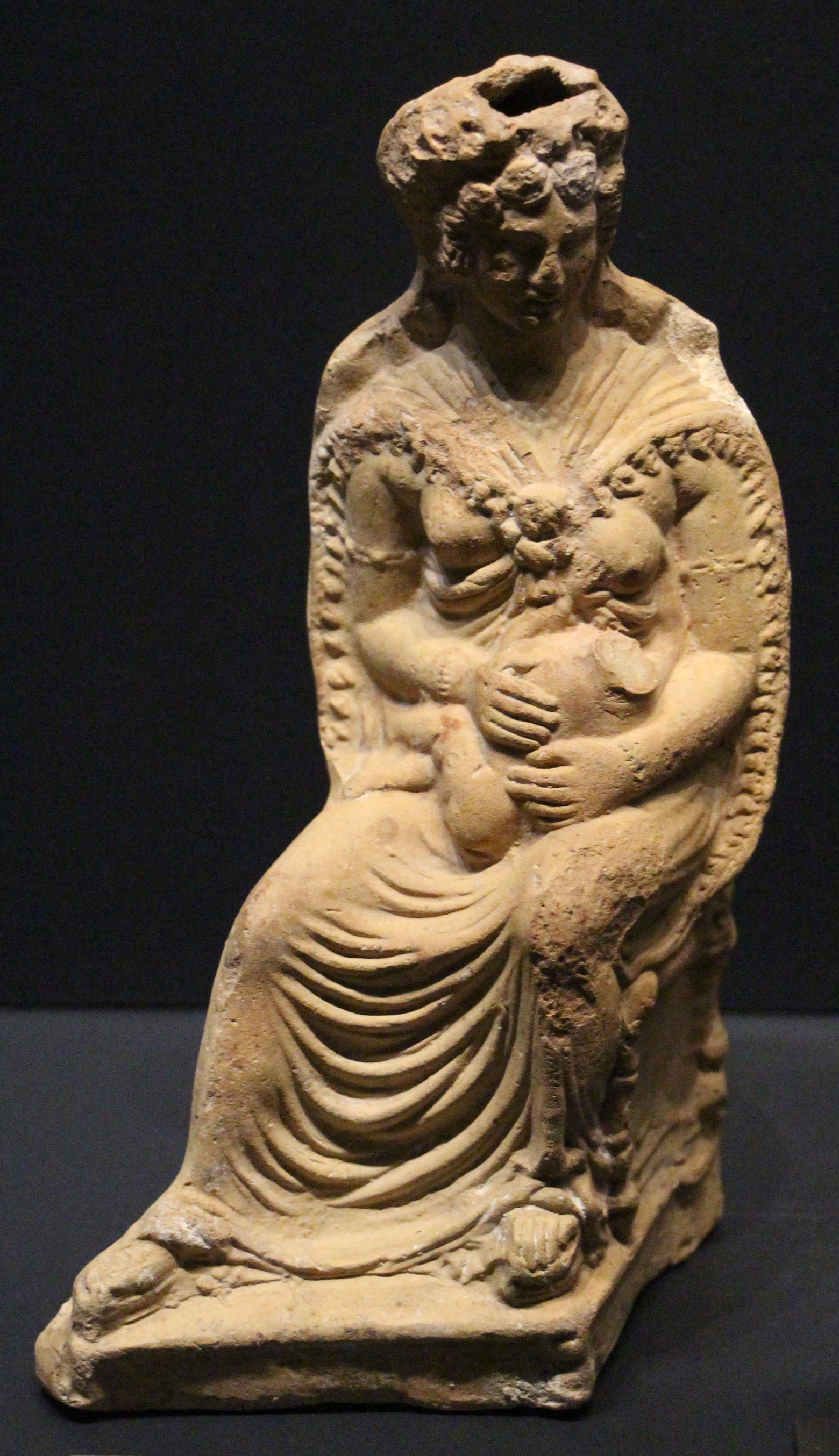
1st–4th-century statuette of Isis lactans (Louvre)

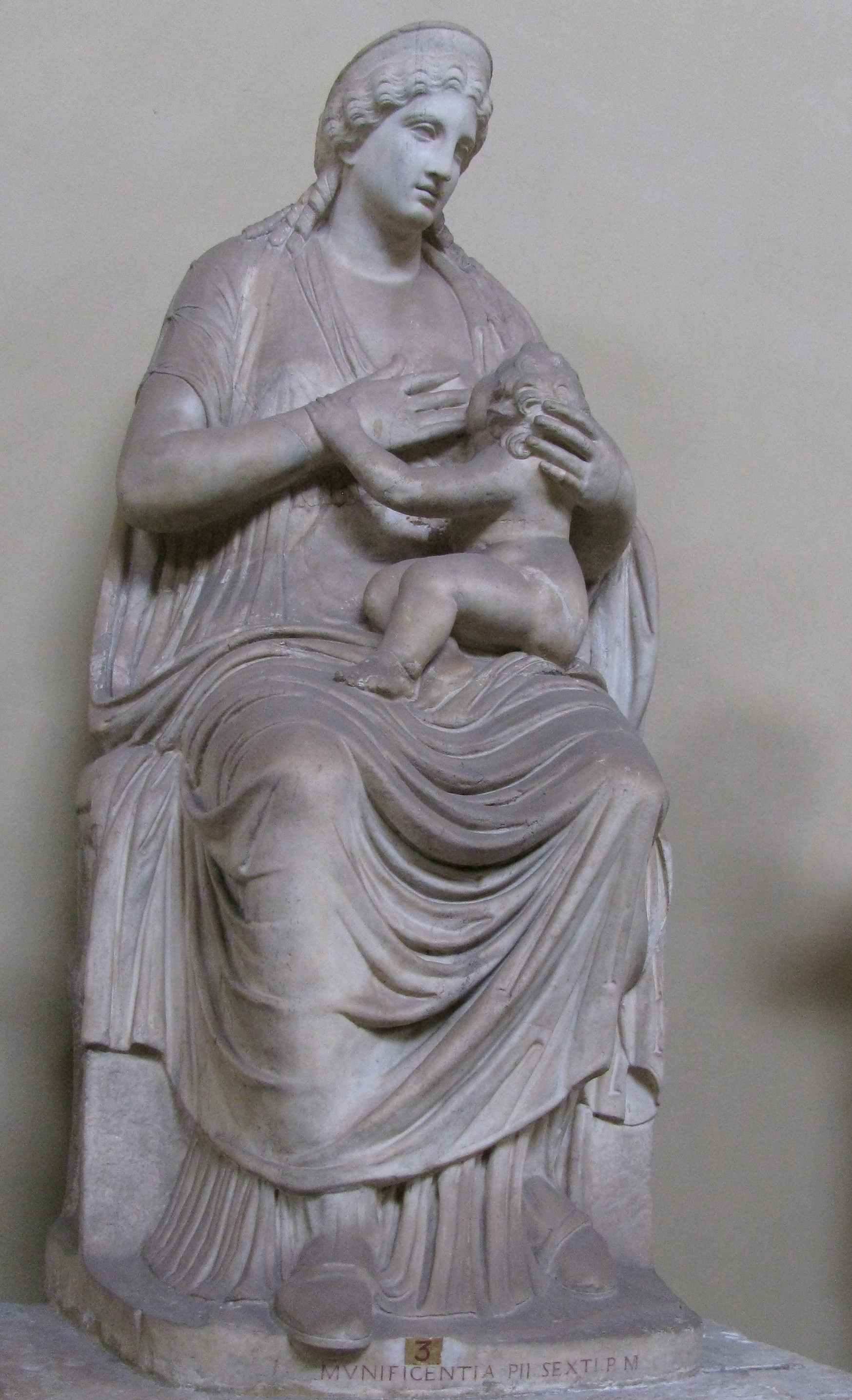
Isis lactans: the mother goddess suckles Harpocrates (Pio-Clementino Museum)

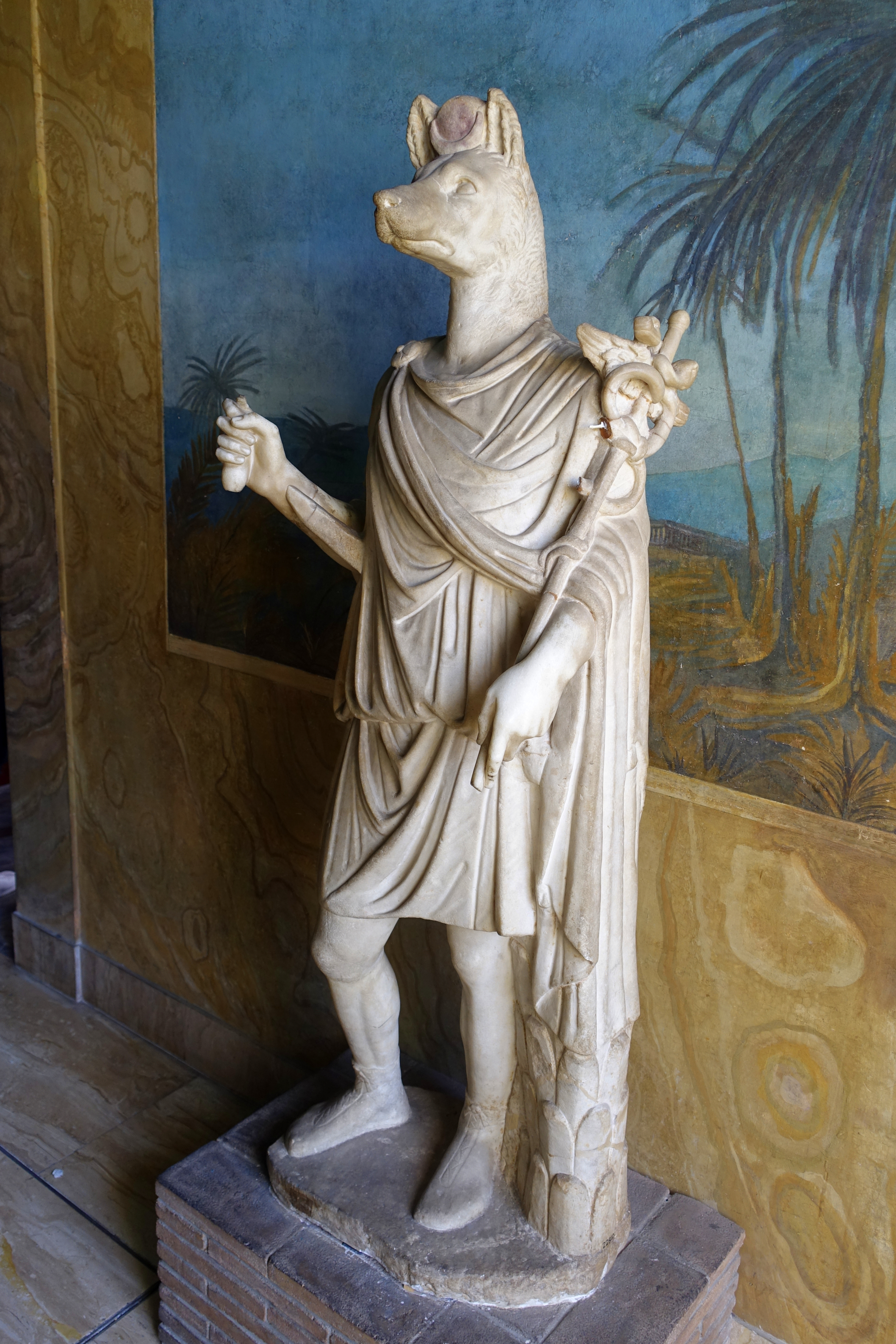
1st/2nd-century Parian marble statue of Anubis (Gregorian Egyptian Museum)

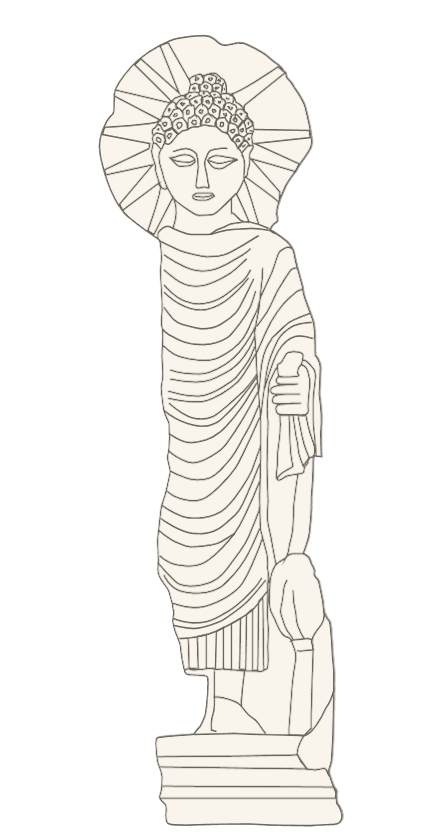
The Berenike Buddha, discovered in Berenice, Egypt, 2nd century CE.

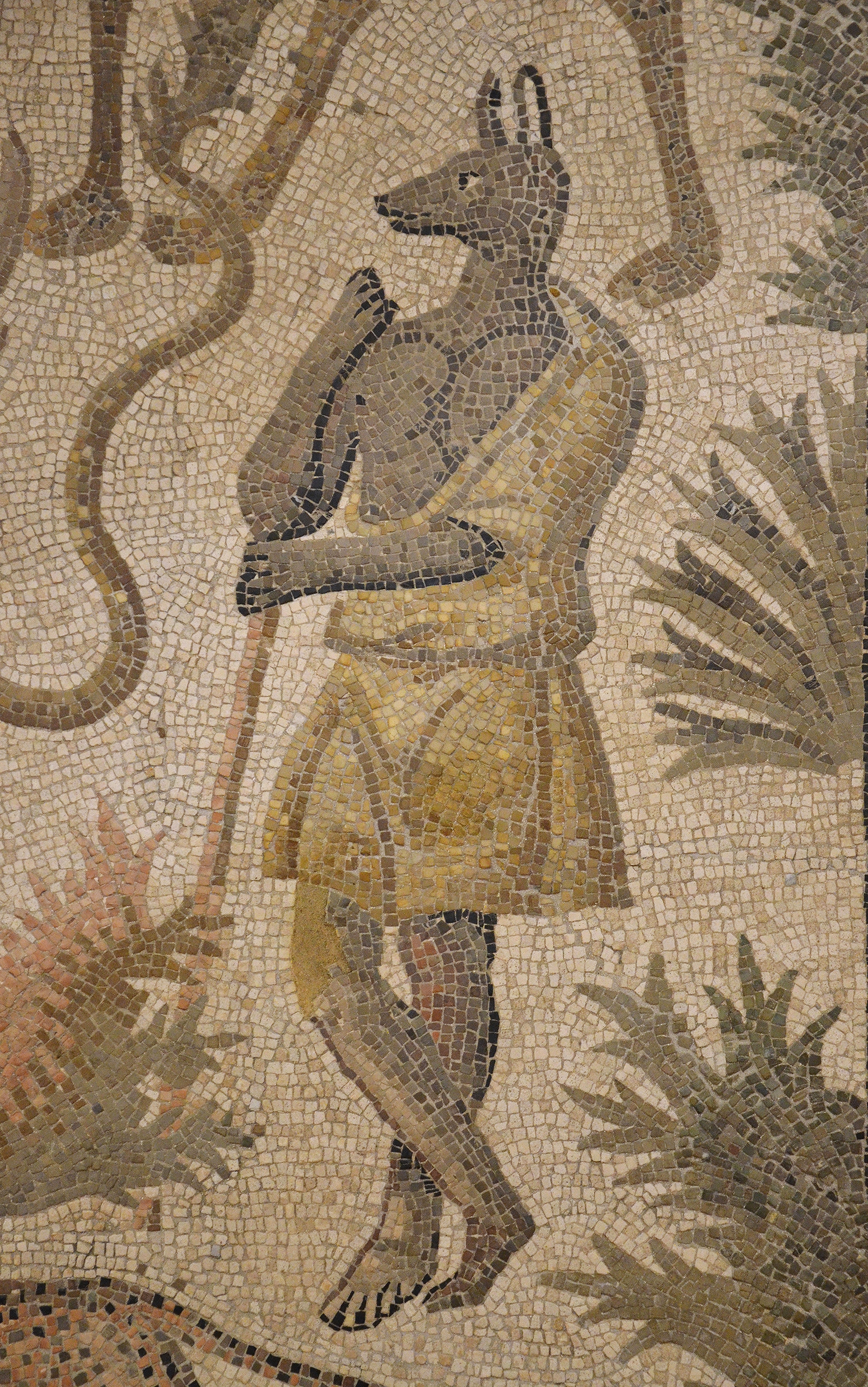
2nd/3rd-century mosaic of Anubis from Ariminum (Museo della Città, Rimini)

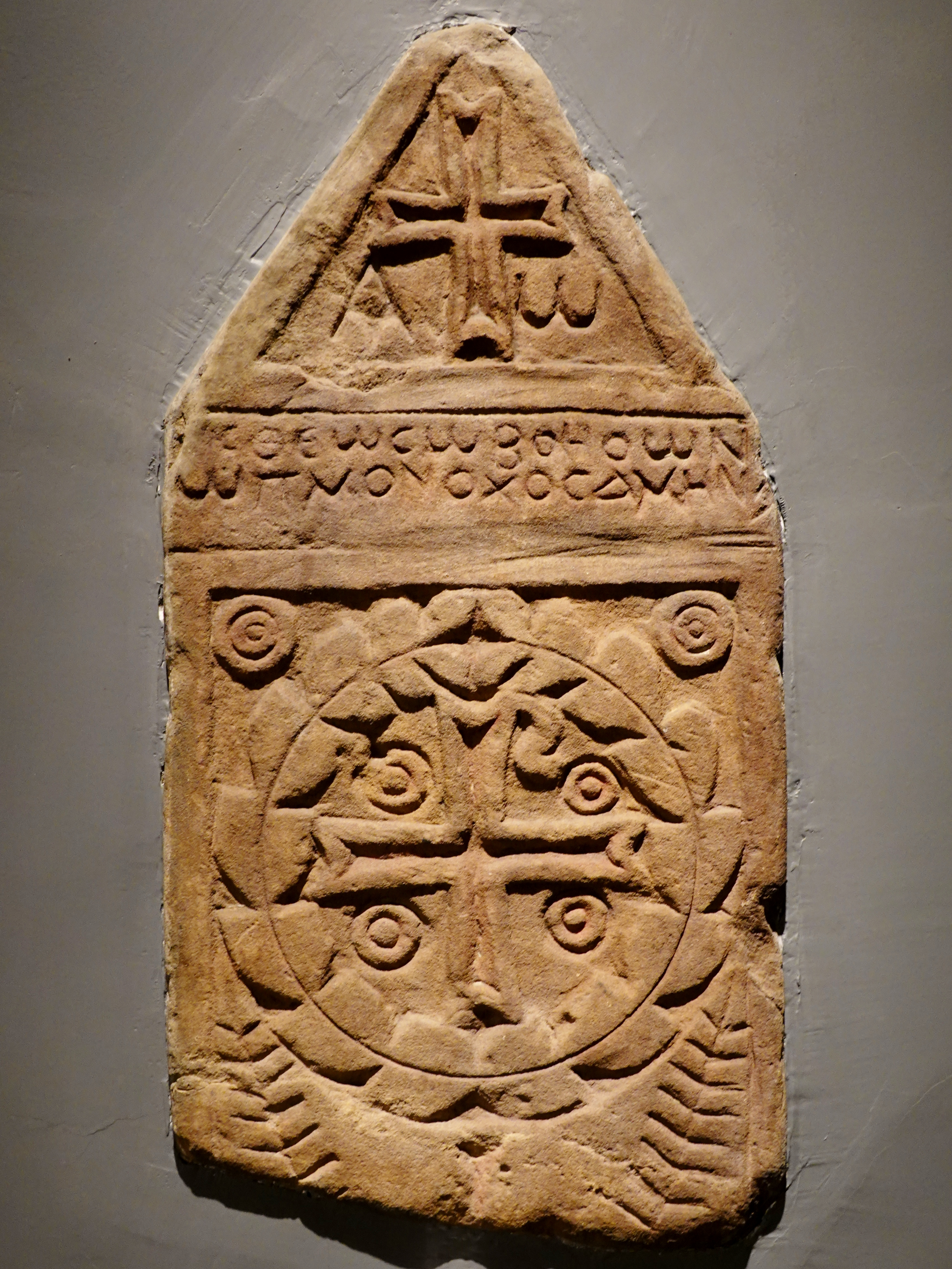
6th- or 7th-century Christian sandstone grave stela (Luxor Museum)

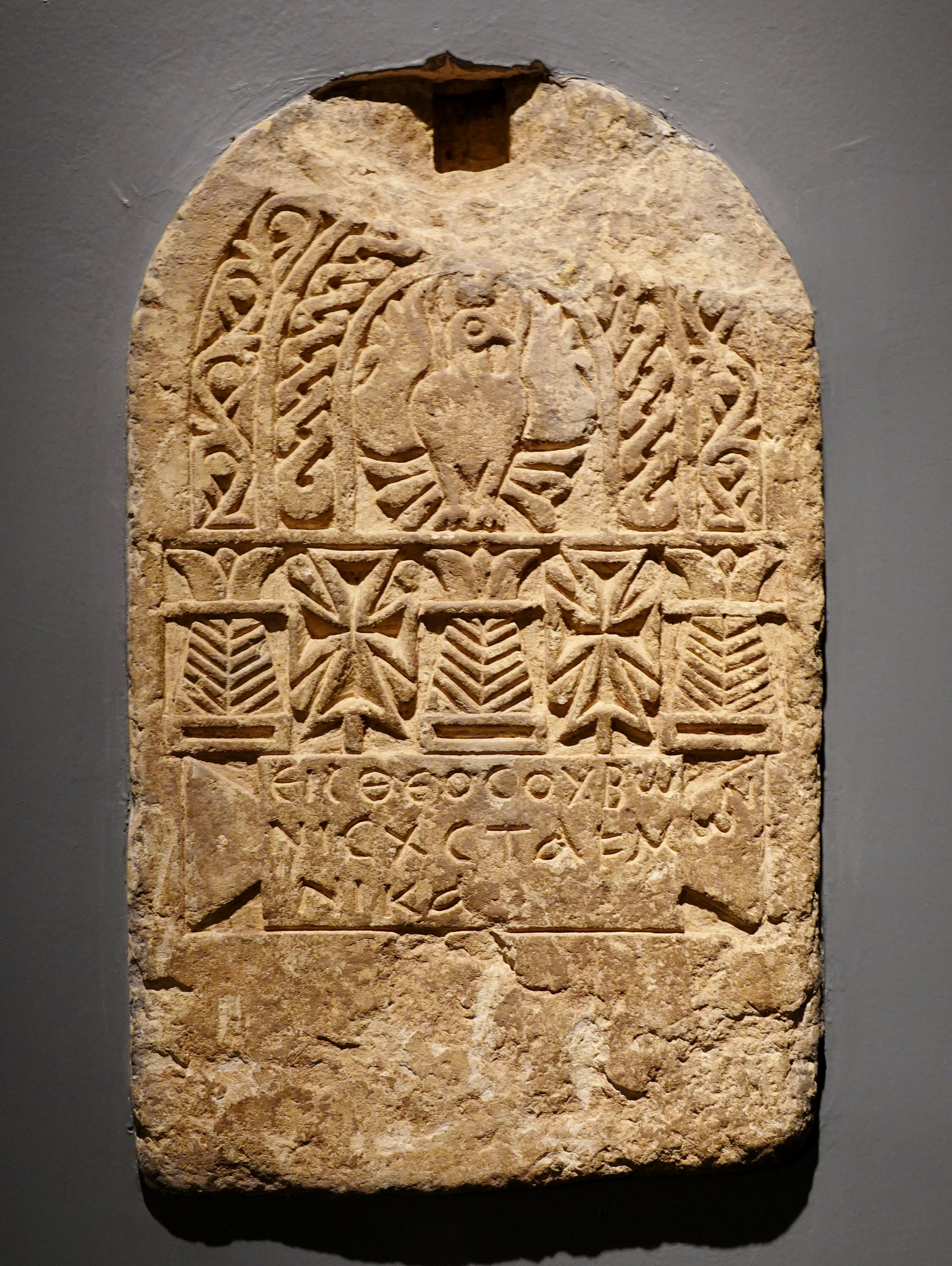
6th- or 7th-century Christian sandstone stela (Luxor Museum)

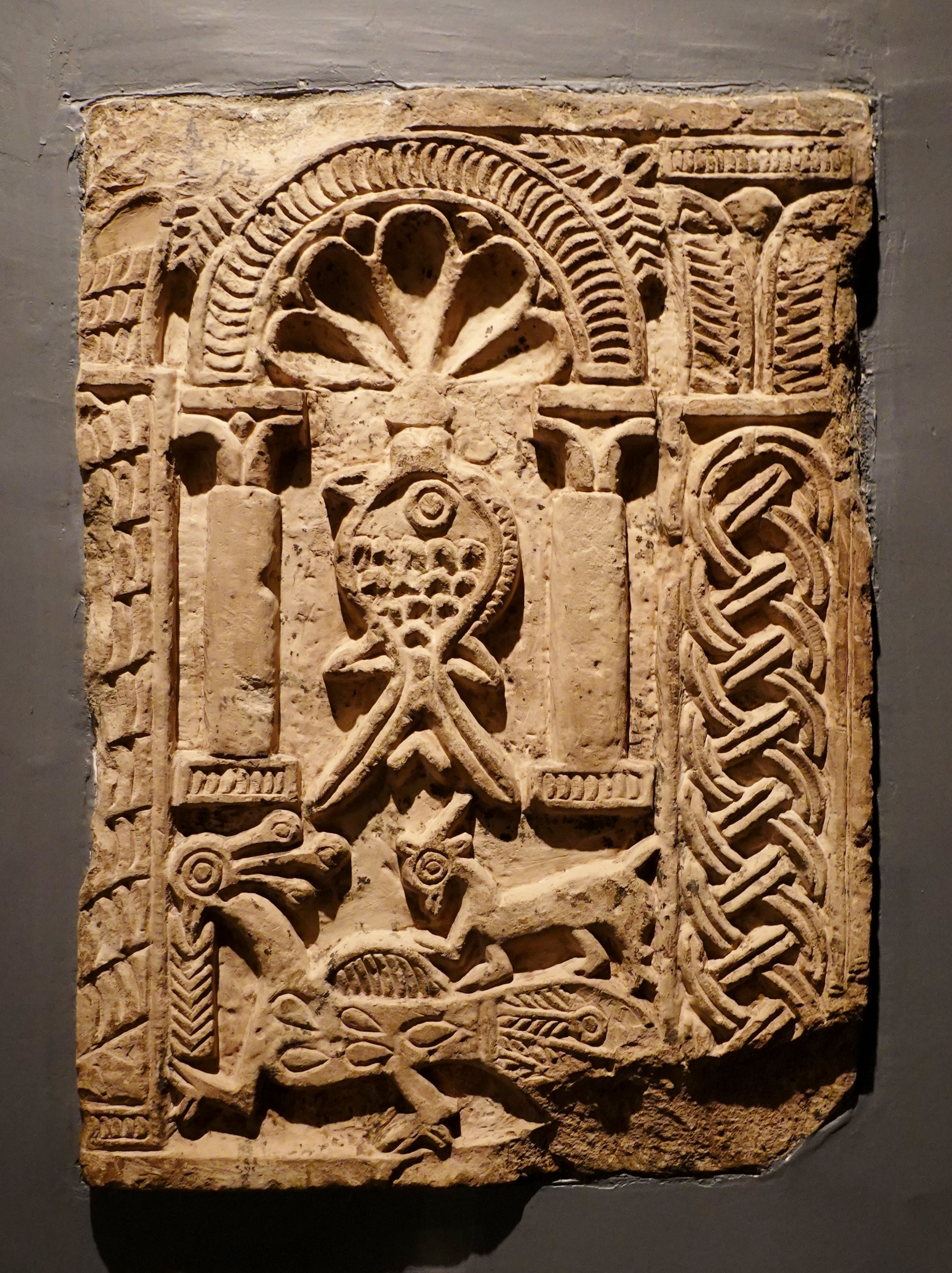
6th- or 7th-century Christian sandstone relief (Luxor Museum)

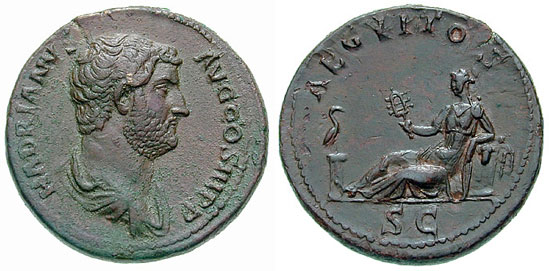
Hadrian coin celebrating Aegyptus Province, struck c. 135. In the obverse, Egypt is personified as a reclining woman holding the sistrum of Hathor. Her left elbow rests on a basket of grain, while an ibis stands on the column at her feet.

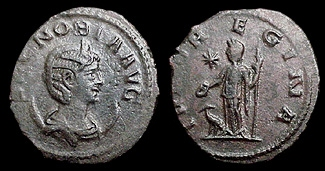
Zenobia coin reporting her title as queen of Egypt (Augusta), and showing her diademed and draped bust on a crescent. The obverse shows a standing figure of Ivno Regina (Juno) holding a patera in her right hand and a sceptre in her left hand, with a peacock at her feet and a brilliant star on the left.

== See also ==
- Roman pharaoh
