= St Mark's Basilica =

Cathedral church in Venice, Italy

Coordinates: 45°26′04″N 12°20′23″E

- Basilica di San Marco
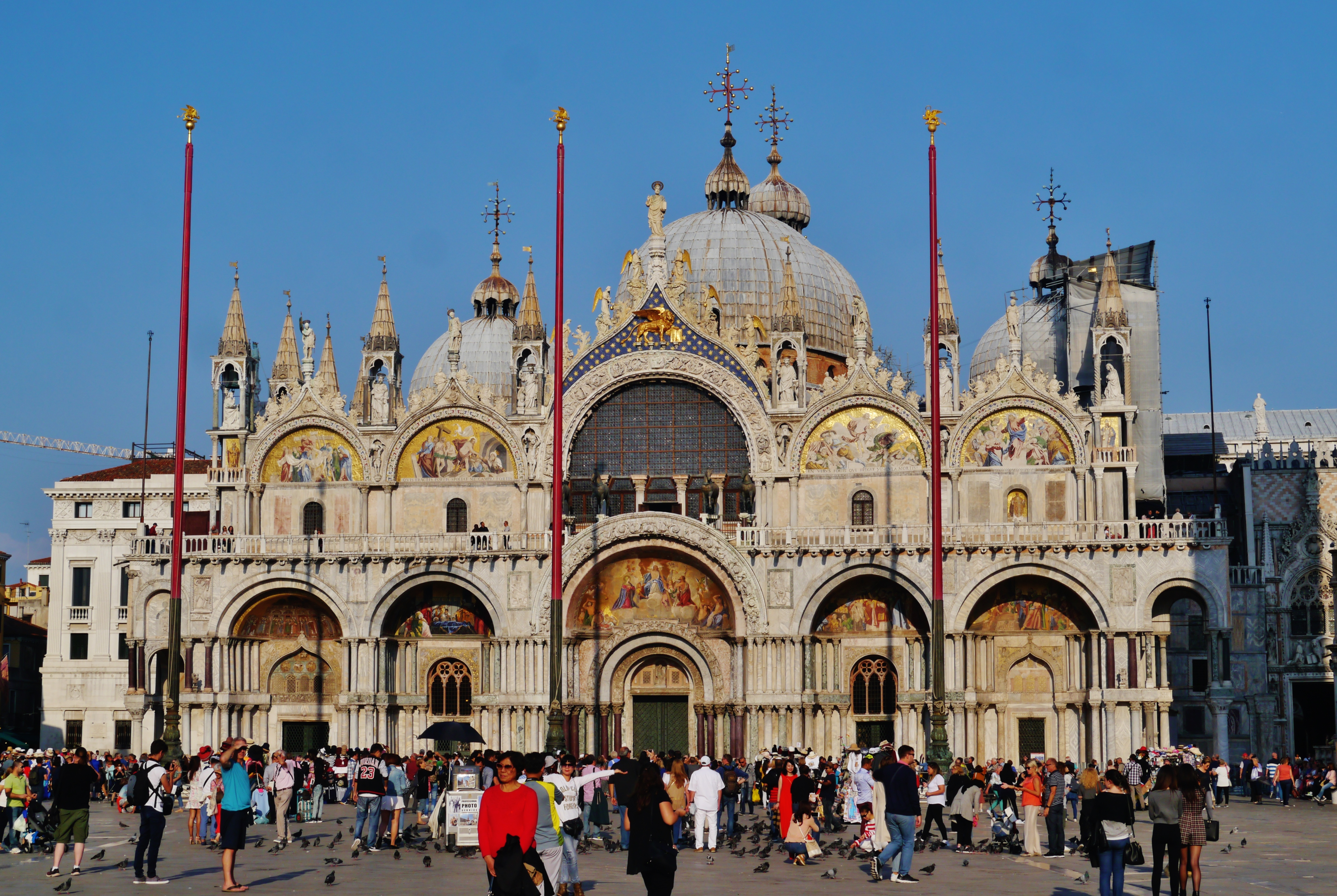
- Main façade of St Mark's Basilica at Piazza San Marco

Religion
- Affiliation: Catholic Church
- Patron: Mark the Evangelist
- Year consecrated: 8 October 1094

Location
- Location: Venice, Italy
- Interactive map of St Mark's Basilica

Architecture
- Style: Byzantine, Romanesque, Gothic
- Groundbreaking: c. 829
- Completed: c. 836

Specifications
- Length: 76.5 metres (251 ft)
- Width: 62.6 metres (205 ft)
- Dome height (outer): 43 metres (141 ft)
- Dome height (inner): 28.15 metres (92.4 ft)

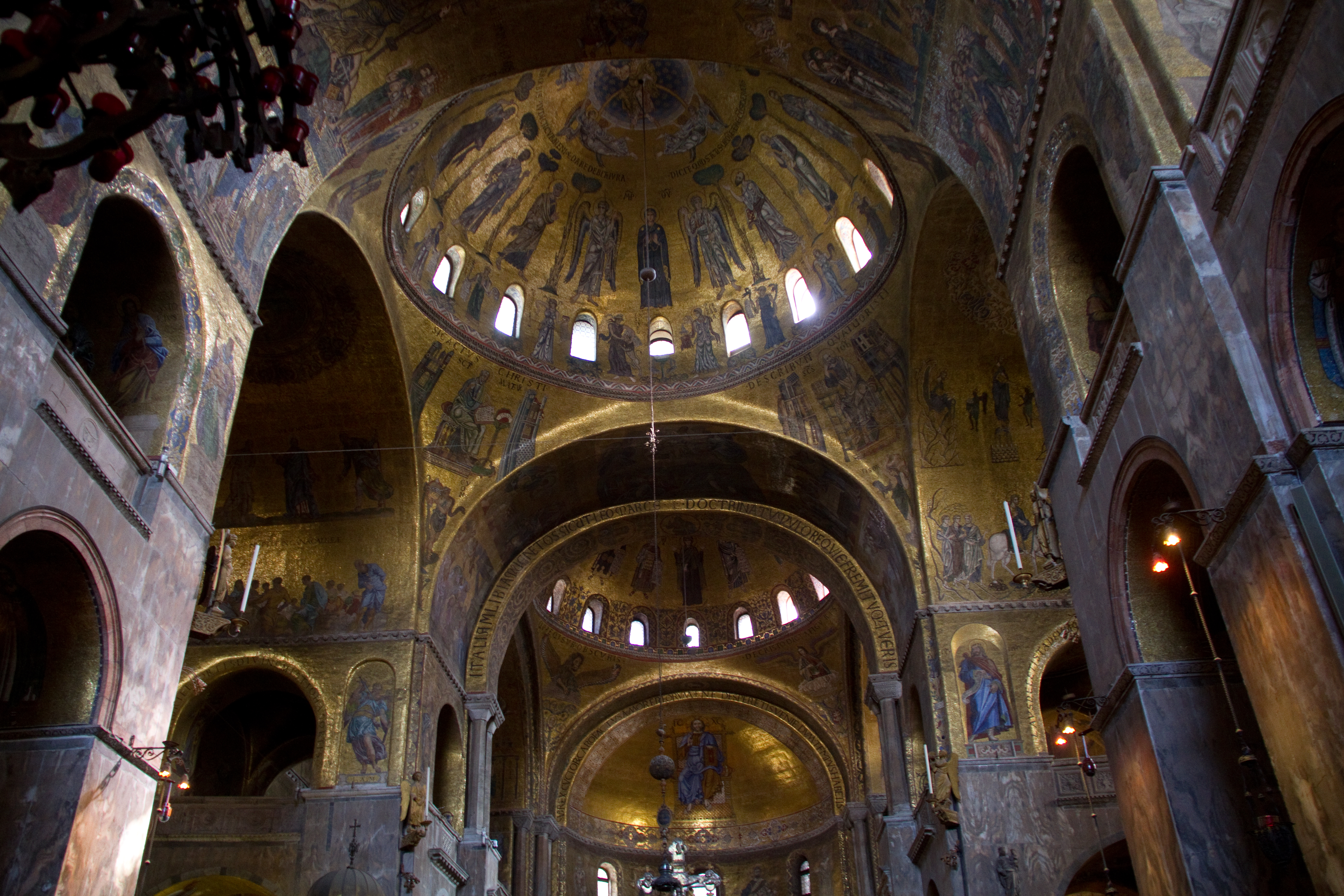
Central nave looking east

The Patriarchal Cathedral Basilica of Saint Mark (Italian: Basilica Cattedrale Patriarcale di San Marco), commonly known as St Mark's Basilica (Italian: Basilica di San Marco; Venetian: Baxéłega de San Marco), is the cathedral church of the Patriarchate of Venice; it became the episcopal seat of the Patriarch of Venice in 1807, replacing the earlier cathedral of San Pietro di Castello. It is dedicated to and holds the relics of Saint Mark the Evangelist, the patron saint of the city.

The church is located on the eastern end of Saint Mark's Square, the former political and religious centre of the Republic of Venice, and is attached to the Doge's Palace. Prior to the fall of the republic in 1797, it was the chapel of the Doge and was subject to his jurisdiction, with the concurrence of the procurators of Saint Mark for administrative and financial affairs.

The present structure is the third church, begun probably in 1063 to express Venice's growing civic consciousness and pride. Like the two earlier churches, its model was the sixth-century Church of the Holy Apostles in Constantinople, although accommodations were made to adapt the design to the limitations of the physical site and to meet the specific needs of Venetian state ceremonies. Middle-Byzantine, Romanesque, and Islamic influences are also evident, and Gothic elements were later incorporated. To convey the republic's wealth and power, the original brick façades and interior walls were embellished over time with precious stones and rare marbles, primarily in the thirteenth century. Many of the columns, reliefs, and sculptures were spoils stripped from the churches, palaces, and public monuments of Constantinople as a result of the Venetian participation in the Fourth Crusade. Among the plundered artefacts brought back to Venice were the four ancient bronze horses that were placed prominently over the entry.

The interior of the domes, the vaults, and the upper walls were slowly covered with gold-ground mosaics depicting saints, prophets, and biblical scenes. Many of these mosaics were later retouched or remade as artistic tastes changed and damaged mosaics had to be replaced, such that the mosaics represent eight hundred years of artistic styles. Some of them derive from traditional Byzantine representations and are masterworks of Medieval art; others are based on preparatory drawings made by prominent Renaissance artists from Venice and Florence, including Paolo Veronese, Tintoretto, Titian, Paolo Uccello, and Andrea del Castagno.

== History ==
=== Participazio church (c. 829–976) ===
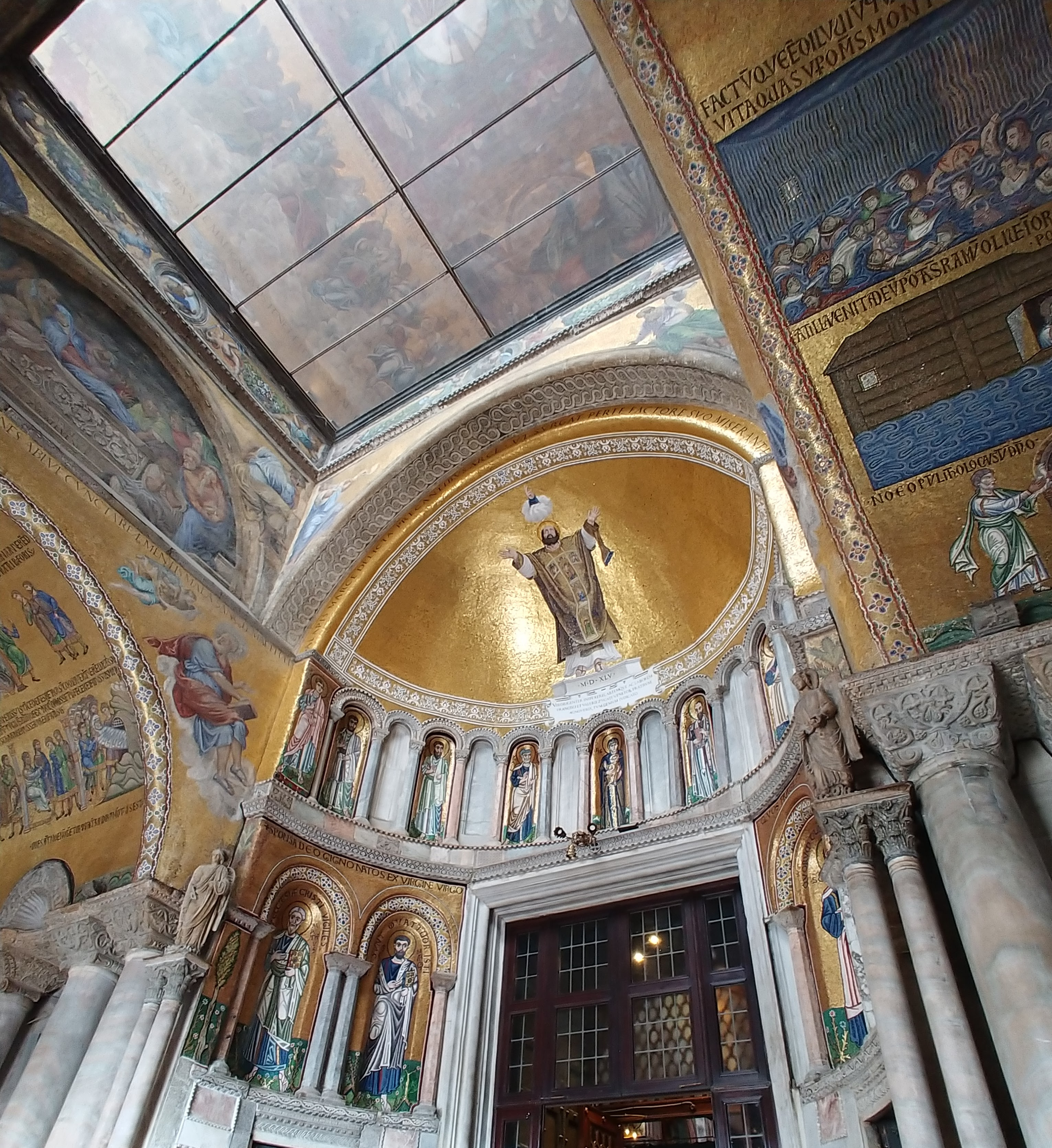
The entry to St Mark's, believed to date to the Participazio church

Several medieval chronicles narrate the translatio, the removal of Saint Mark's body (excluding the head) from Alexandria in Egypt by two Venetian merchants and its transfer to Venice in 828/829. The Chronicon Venetum further recounts that the relics of Saint Mark were initially placed in a corner tower of the castrum, the fortified residence of the Doge and seat of government located on the site of the present Doge's Palace. Doge Giustiniano Participazio (in office 827–829) subsequently stipulated in his will that his widow and his younger brother and successor Giovanni (in office 829–832) were to erect a church dedicated to Saint Mark wherein the relics would ultimately be housed. Giustiniano further specified that the new church was to be built between the castrum and the Church of Saint Theodore to the north. Construction of the new church may have actually been underway during Doge Giustiniano's lifetime and was completed by 836 when the relics of Saint Mark were transferred.

Although the Participazio church was long believed to have been a rectangular structure with a single apse, soundings and excavations have demonstrated that St Mark's was from the beginning a cruciform church with at least a central dome, likely in wood. It has not been unequivocally established if each of the four crossarms of the church had a similar dome or were instead covered with gabled wooden roofs.

The prototype was the Church of the Holy Apostles (demolished 1461) in Constantinople. This radical break with the local architectural tradition of a rectangular plan in favour of a centrally planned Byzantine model reflected the growing commercial presence of Venetian merchants in the imperial capital as well as Venice's political ties with Byzantium. More importantly, it underscored that St Mark's was intended not as an ecclesiastical seat but as a state sanctuary.

Remnants of the Participazio church likely survive and are generally believed to include the foundations and lower parts of several of the principal walls, including the western wall between the nave and the narthex. The great entry portal may also date to the early church as well as the western portion of the crypt, under the central dome, which seems to have served as the base for a raised dais upon which the original altar was located. (Note: Wladimiro Dorigo alternatively hypothesizes that the Participizio church corresponded only to the crypt, including the section, now walled, under the central dome, which Dorigo interprets as the remains of an early westwork. See Wladimiro Dorigo, Venezia romanica..., I, pp. 20–21.)

=== Orseolo church (976–c. 1063) ===
The Participazio church was severely damaged in 976 during the popular uprising against Doge Pietro IV Candiano (in office 959–976) when the fire that angry crowds had set to drive the Doge from the castrum spread to the adjoining church. Although the structure was not completely destroyed, it was compromised to the point that the Concio, the general assembly, had to alternatively convene in the cathedral of San Pietro di Castello to elect Candiano's successor, Pietro I Orseolo (in office 976–978). Within two years, the church was repaired and at the sole expense of the Orseolo family, indications that the actual damage was relatively limited. Most likely, the wooden components had been consumed, but the walls and supports remained largely intact.

Nothing certain is known of the appearance of the Orseolo church. But given the short duration of the reconstruction, it is probable that work was limited to repairing damage with little innovation. It was at this time, however, that the tomb of Saint Mark, located in the main apse, was surmounted with brick vaults, creating the semi-enclosed shrine that would later be incorporated into the crypt when the floor of the chancel was raised during the construction of the third church.

=== Contarini church (c. 1063–present) ===
==== Construction ====
Civic pride led many Italian cities in the mid-eleventh century to begin erecting or rebuilding their cathedrals on a grand scale. Venice was similarly interested in demonstrating its growing commercial wealth and power, and probably in 1063, under Doge Domenico I Contarini (in office 1043–1071), St Mark's was substantially rebuilt and enlarged to the extent that the resulting structure appeared entirely new.

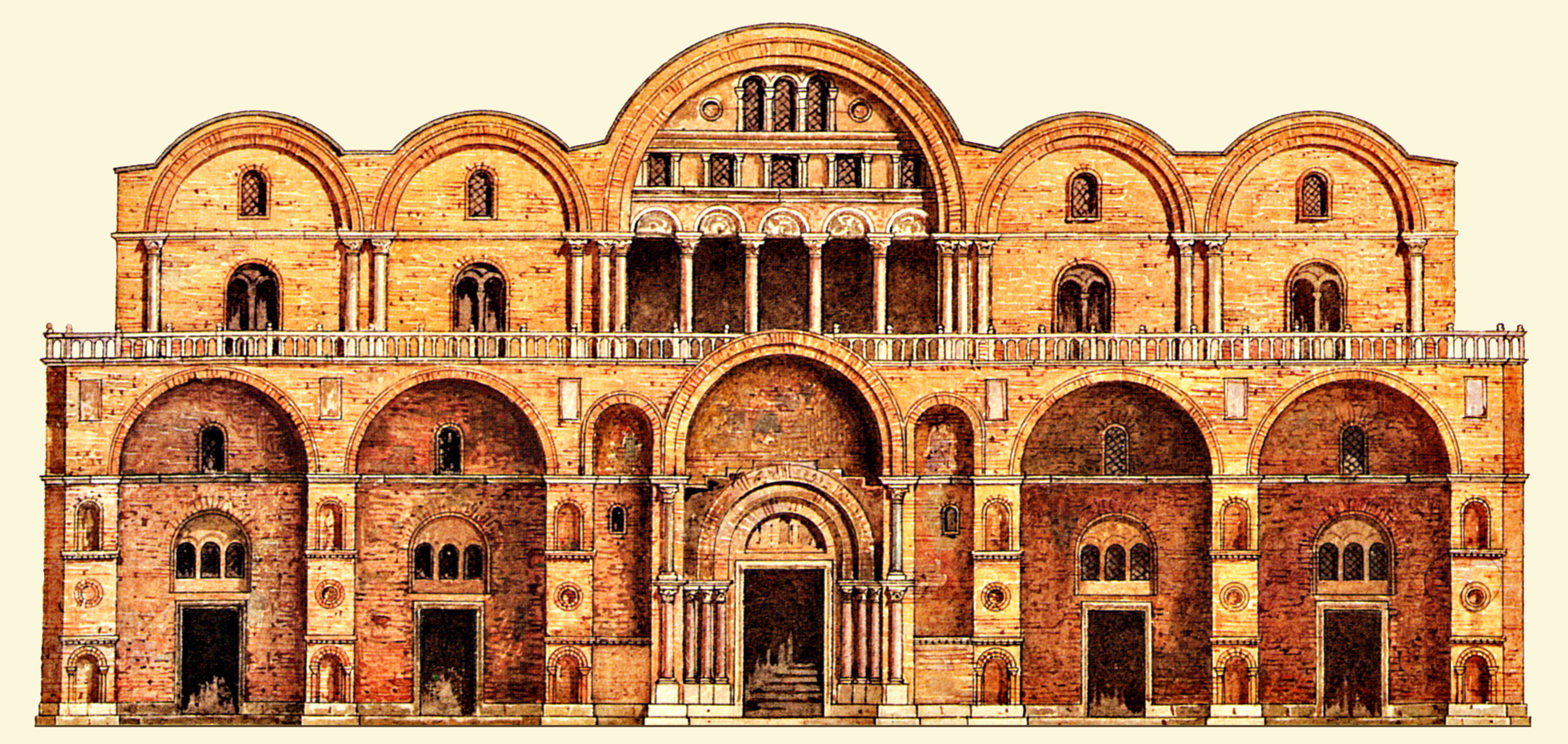
Antonio Pellanda, reconstruction of the western façade of the Contarini church (1881)

The northern transept was lengthened, likely by incorporating the southern lateral nave of the Church of Saint Theodore. Similarly, the southern transept was extended, perhaps by integrating a corner tower of the castrum. Most significantly, the wooden domes were rebuilt in brick. This required strengthening the walls and piers in order to support the new heavy barrel vaults, which in turn were reinforced by arcades along the sides of the northern, southern, and western crossarms. The vaults of the eastern crossarm were supported by inserting single arches that also served to divide the chancel from the choir chapels in the lateral apses.

In front of the western façade, a narthex was built. To accommodate the height of the existing great entry, the vaulting system of the new narthex had to be interrupted in correspondence to the portal, thus creating the shaft above that was later opened to the interior of the church. The crypt was also enlarged to the east, and the high altar was moved from under the central dome to the chancel, which was raised, supported by a network of columns and vaults in the underlying crypt. By 1071, work had progressed far enough that the investiture of Doge Domenico Selvo (in office 1071–1084) could take place in the unfinished church.

Work on the interior began under Selvo, who collected fine marbles and stones for the embellishment of the church and personally financed the mosaic decoration, hiring a master mosaicist from Constantinople. The Pala d'Oro (golden altarpiece), ordered from Constantinople in 1102, was installed on the high altar in 1105. For the consecration under Doge Vitale Falier Dodoni (in office 1084–1095), various dates are recorded, most likely reflecting a series of consecrations of different sections. The consecration on 8 October 1094 is considered to be the dedication of the church. On that day, the relics of Saint Mark were also placed into the new crypt.

==== Embellishment ====
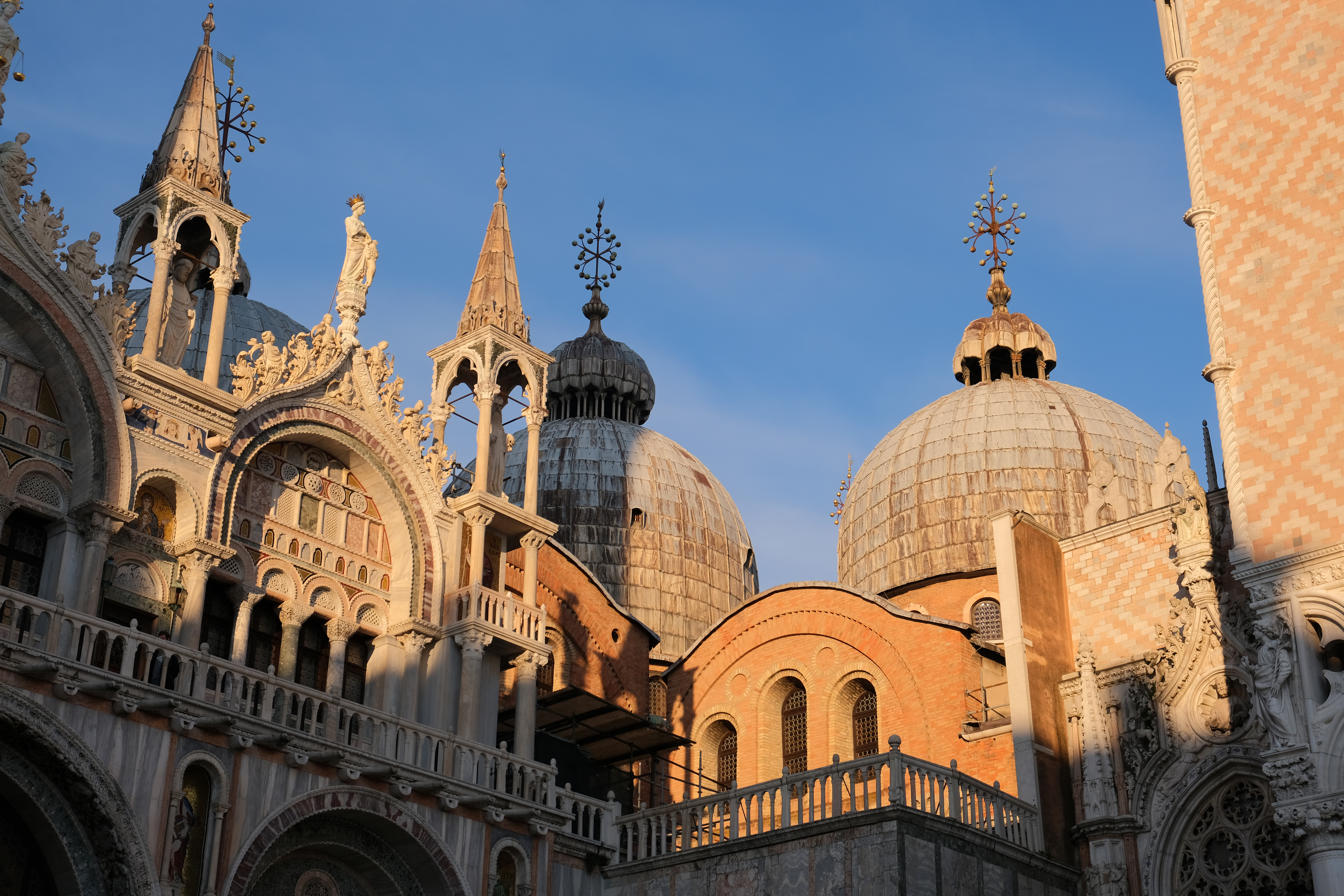
The juncture of the southern and western crossarms, showing the original brickwork and the subsequent embellishment

As built, the Contarini church was a severe brick structure. Adornment inside was limited to the columns of the arcades, the balusters and parapets of the galleries, and the lattice altar screens. The wall surfaces were decorated with moulded arches that alternated with engaged brickwork columns as well as niches and a few cornices. With the exception of the outside of the apse and the western façade that faced Saint Mark's Square, the stark brick exterior was enlivened only by receding concentric arches in contrasting brick around the windows.

The western façade, comparable to middle-Byzantine churches erected in the tenth and eleventh centuries, was characterized by a series of arches set between protruding pillars. The walls were pierced by windows set in larger blind arches, while the intervening pillars were adorned with niches and circular patere made of rare marbles and stones that were surrounded with ornamental frames. Other decorative details, including friezes and corbel tables, reflected Romanesque trends, an indication of the taste and craftsmanship of the Italian workers.

With few exceptions, most notably the juncture of the southern and western crossarms, both the exterior and interior of the church were subsequently sheathed with revetments of marble and precious stones and enriched with columns, reliefs, and sculptures. Many of these ornamental elements were spolia taken from ancient or Byzantine buildings. Particularly in the period of the Latin Empire (1204–1261), following the Fourth Crusade, the Venetians pillaged the churches, palaces, and public monuments of Constantinople and stripped them of polychrome columns and stones. Once in Venice, some of the columns were sliced for revetmets and patere; others were paired and spread across the façades or used as altars. Despoliation continued in later centuries, notably during the Venetian–Genoese Wars. Venetian sculptors also integrated the spoils with local productions, copying the Byzantine capitals and friezes so effectively that some of their work can only be distinguished with difficulty from the originals.

==== Later modifications ====
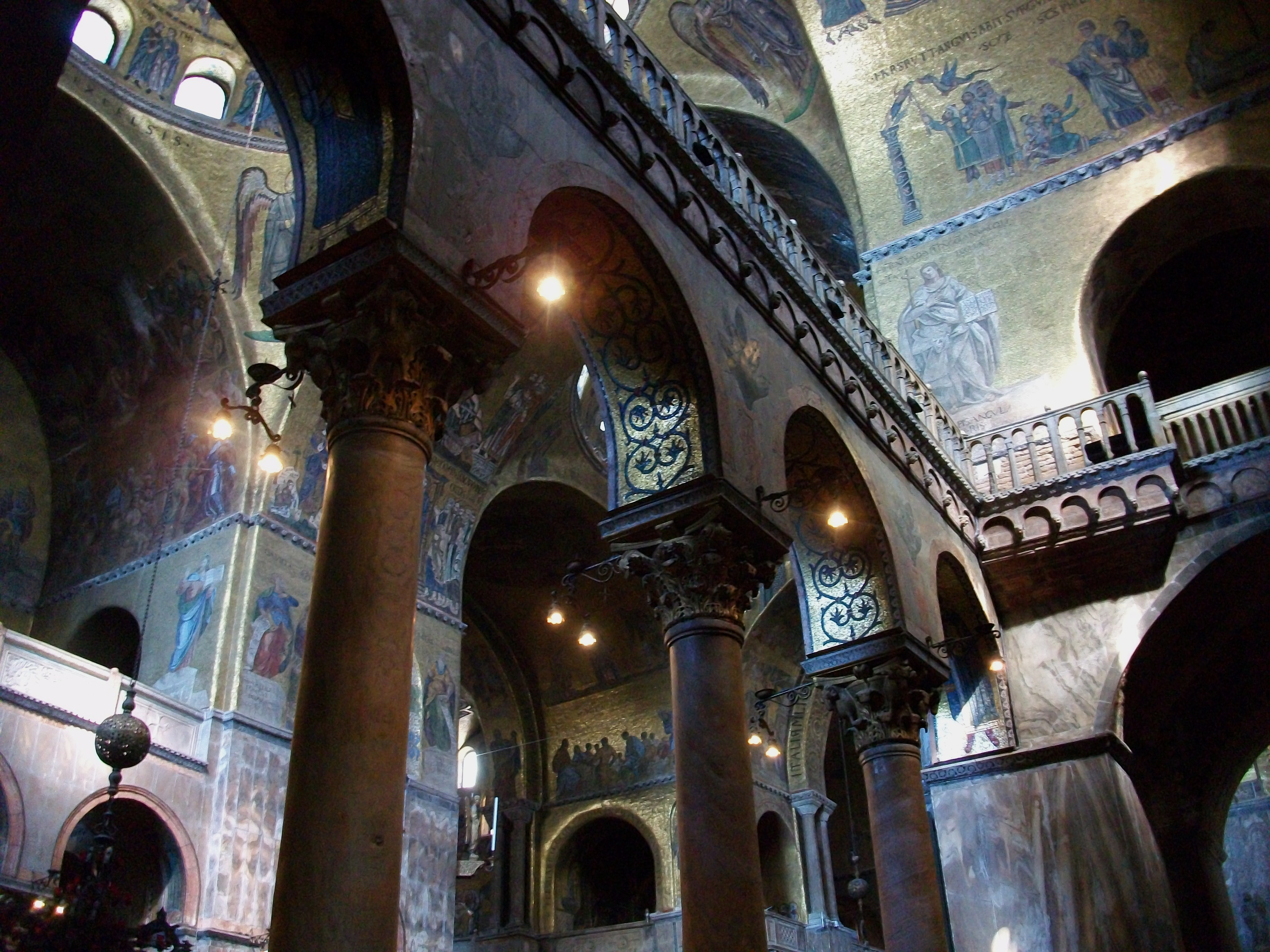
The lateral aisle of the western crossarm, showing the arcade that strengthens the vault and the walkways above which were created with the removal of the galleries

In addition to the sixteen windows in each of the five domes, the church was originally lit by three or seven windows in the apse and probably eight in each of the lunettes. But many of these windows were later walled up to create more surface space for the mosaic decoration, with the result that the interior received insufficient sunlight, particularly the areas under the galleries which remained in relative darkness. The galleries were consequently reduced to narrow walkways with the exception of the ends of the northern, southern, and western crossarms where they remain. These walkways maintain the original relief panels of the galleries on the side facing the central section of the church. On the opposite side, new balustrades were erected.

The narthex of the Contarini church was originally limited to the western side. As with other Byzantine churches, it extended laterally beyond the façade on both sides and terminated in niches, of which the northern remains. The southern terminus was separated by a wall in the early twelfth century, thus creating an entry hall that opened on the southern façade toward the Doge's Palace and the waterfront. In the early thirteenth century, the narthex was extended along the northern and southern sides to completely surround the western crossarm.

Also, in the first half of the thirteenth century, the original low-lying brick domes, typical of Byzantine churches, were surmounted with higher, outer shells supporting bulbous lanterns with crosses. These wooden frames covered in lead provided more protection from weathering to the actual domes below and gave greater visual prominence to the church. Various Near-Eastern models have been suggested as sources of inspiration and construction techniques for the heightened domes, including the Al-Aqsa and Qubbat aṣ-Ṣakhra mosques in Jerusalem and the conical frame erected over the dome of the Church of the Holy Sepulchre in the early thirteenth century.

On 24 June 1968, a portion of Saint Mark’s relics were returned to the Coptic Church of Alexandria as a significant gesture of goodwill, and were reunited with the head.

== Architecture ==
=== Exterior ===
The three exposed façades result from a long and complex evolution. Particularly in the thirteenth century, the exterior appearance of the church was radically altered: the patterned marble encrustation was added, and a multitude of columns with cipollino marble shafts, and sculptural elements was applied to enrich the state church. It is probable that structural elements were also added to the façades or modified.

==== Western façade ====
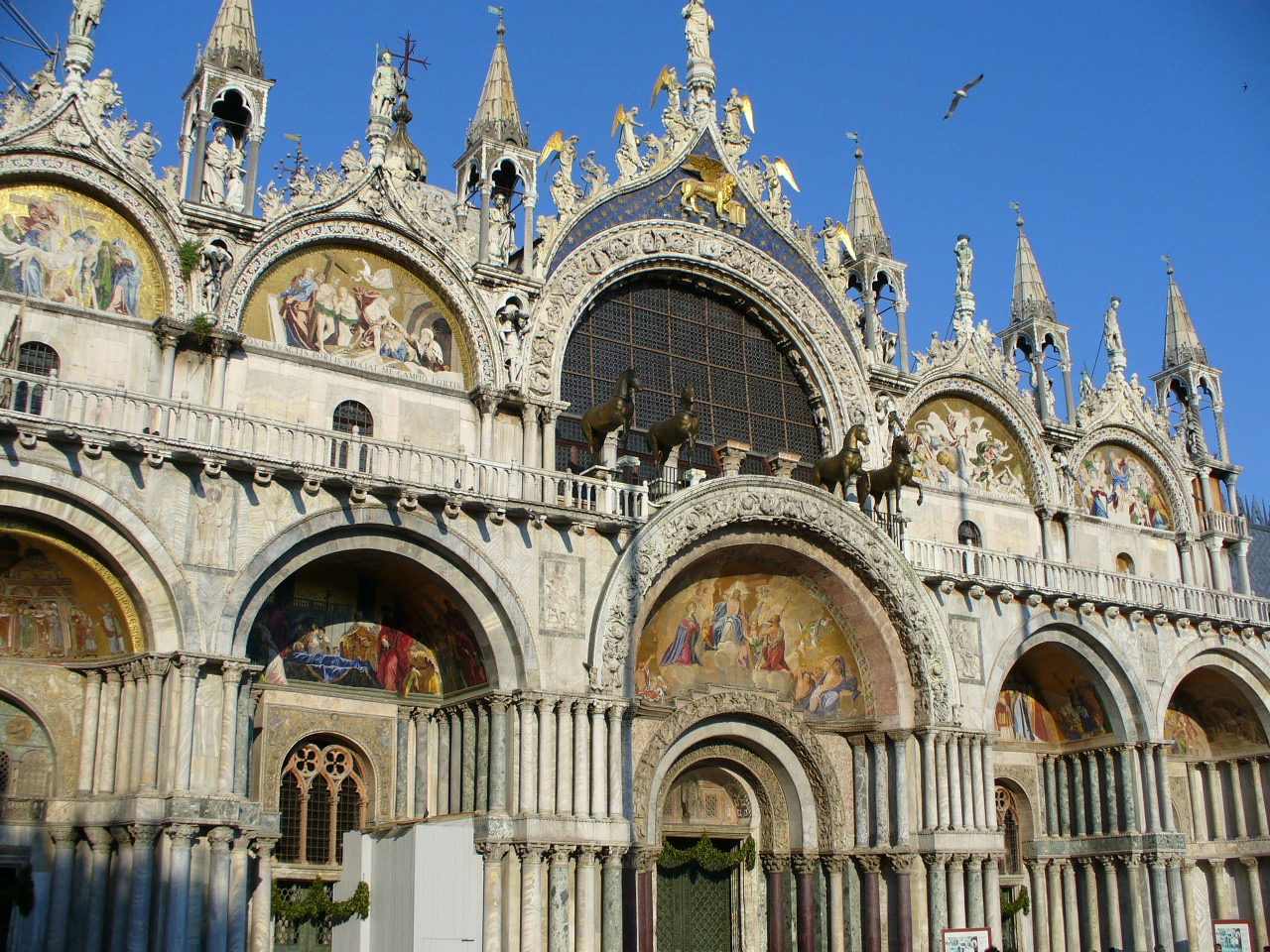
Western façade

The exterior of the basilica is divided into two registers. On the western façade, the lower register is dominated by five deeply recessed portals that alternate with large piers. The lower register was later completely covered with two tiers of precious columns, largely spoils from the Fourth Crusade.

Consistent with Byzantine traditions, the sculptural elements are largely decorative: only in the arches that frame the doorways is there a functional use of sculpture that articulates the architectural lines. In addition to the reliefs in the spandrels, the sculpture at the lower level, relatively limited, includes narrow Romanesque bands, statues, and richly carved borders of foliage mixed with figures derived from Byzantine and Islamic traditions. The eastern influence is most pronounced in the tympana over the northern-most and southern-most portals.

The iconographic programme is expressed primarily in the mosaics in the lunettes. In the lower register, those of the lateral portals narrate the translatio, the translation of Saint Mark's relics from Alexandria to Venice. From right to left, they show the removal of the saint's body from Egypt, its arrival in Venice, its veneration by the Doge, and its deposition in the church. This last mosaic is the only one on the façade that survives from the thirteenth century; the others were remade in the seventeenth, eighteenth, and nineteenth centuries. The general appearance of the lost compositions is recorded in Gentile Bellini's Procession in Piazza San Marco (1496), which also documents the earlier gilding on the façade.

Spoils from the Fourth Crusade
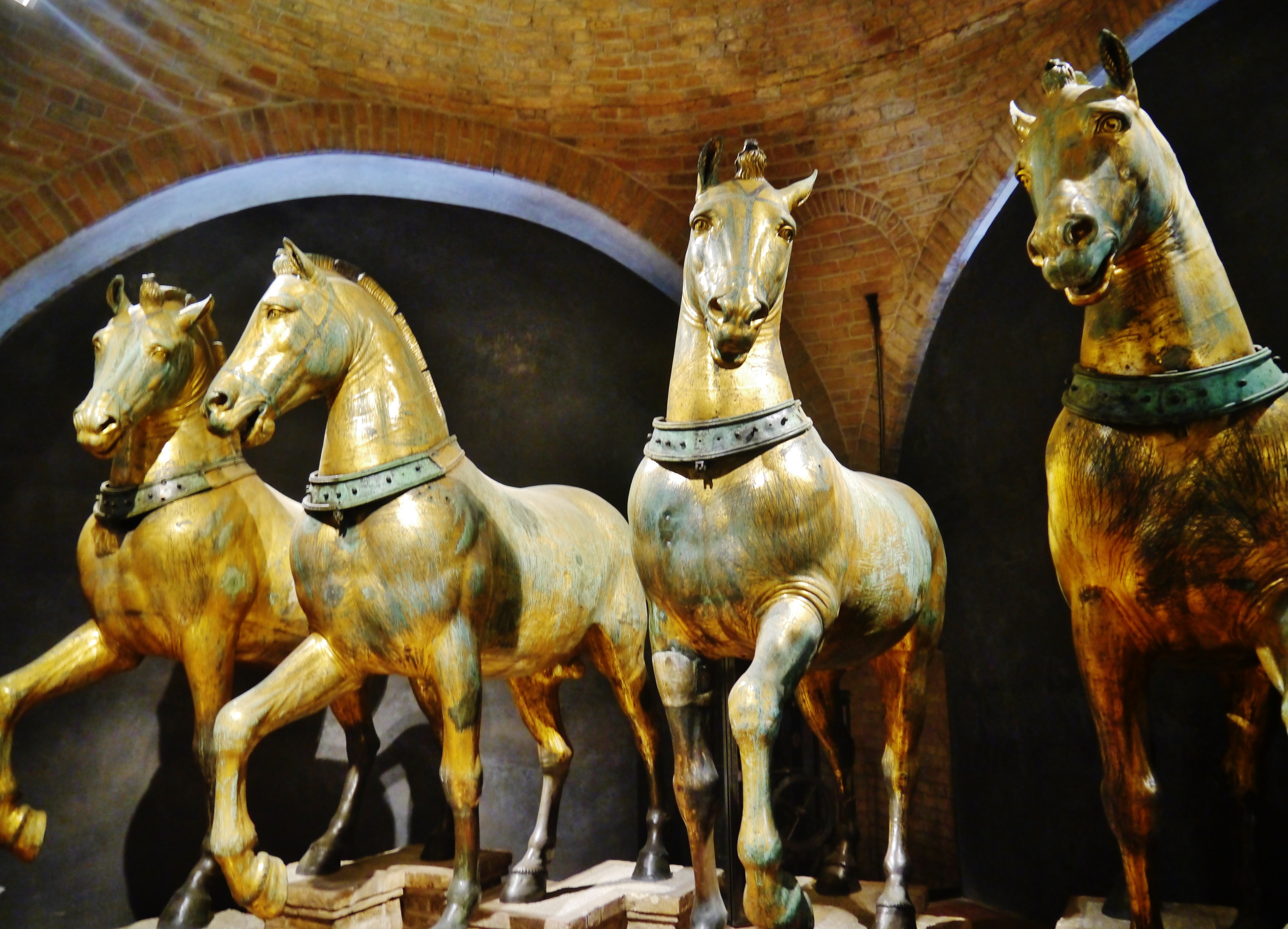
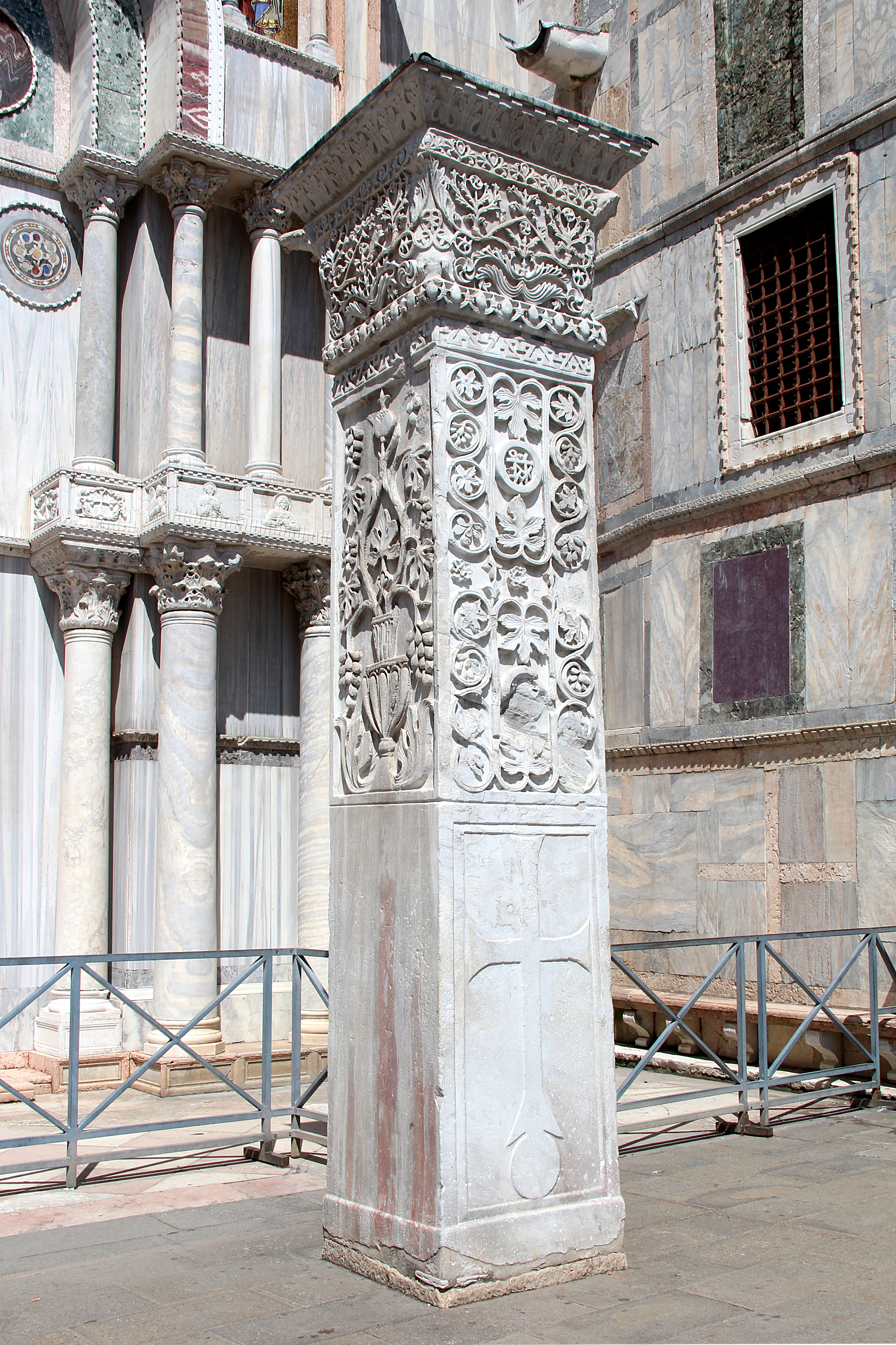
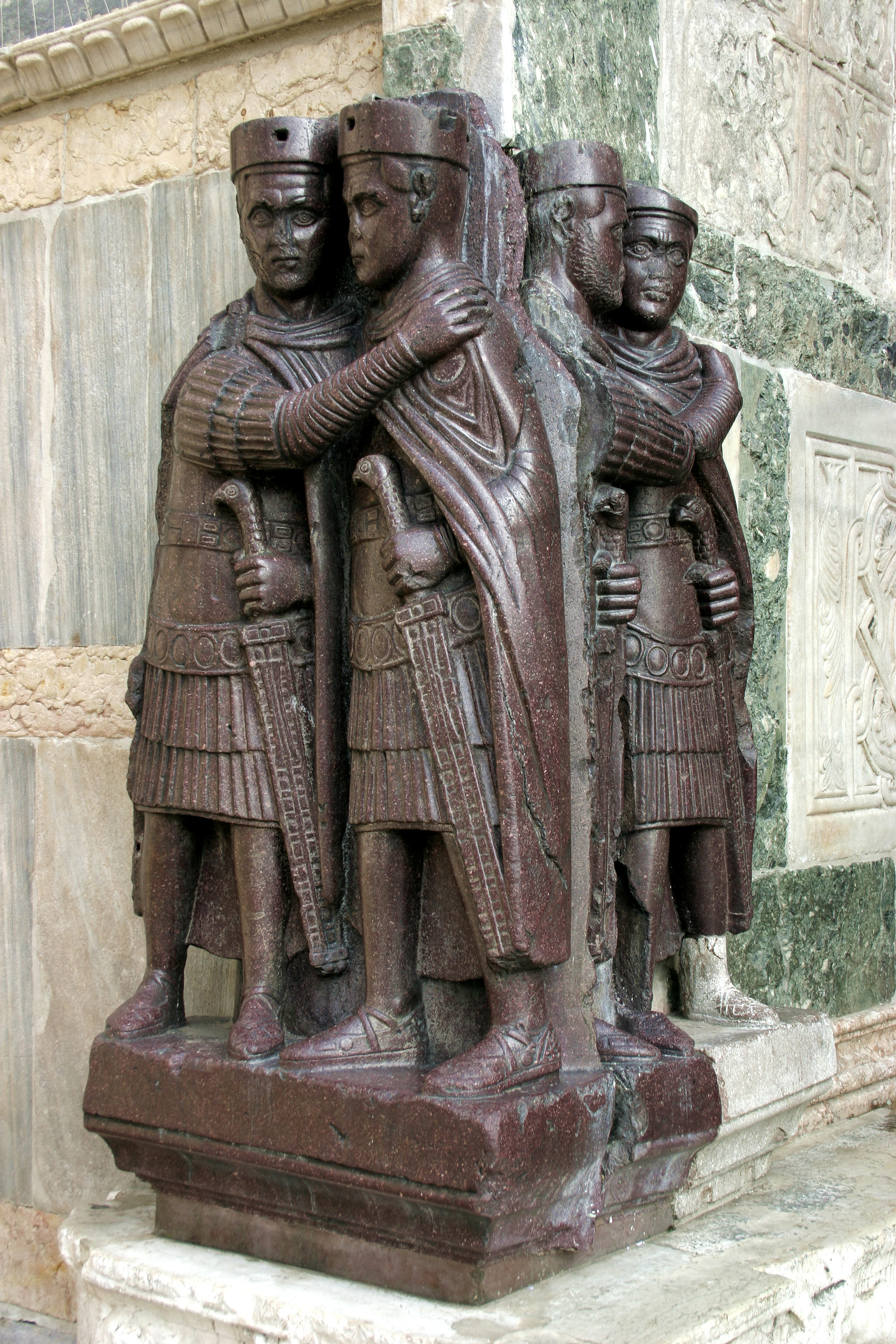
Quadriga from the Hippodrome (above), one of two pillars from the Church of St Polyeuctus (lower left), statue of the 'Four Tetrarchs', possibly from the Philadelphion (lower right)

The upper register is enriched with an elaborate Gothic crowning, executed in the late-fourteenth/early-fifteenth centuries. The original lunettes, transformed into ogee arches, are outlined with foliage and topped with statues of four military saints over the lateral lunettes and of Saint Mark flanked by angels over the central lunette, the point of which contains the winged lion of Saint Mark holding a book with the angelic salutation of the praedestinatio: "Peace to you Mark, my Evangelist" ("Pax tibi Marce evangelista meus"). (Note: The current statues were carved by Girolamo Albanese in 1618 in substitution of the originals, destroyed in the earthquake of 1511. See Giulio Lorenzetti, Venezia e il suo estuario..., p. 167) The intervening aediculae with pinnacles house figures of the Four Evangelists and on the extremities, facing one another, the Virgin and the Archangel Gabriel in allusion to Venice's legendary foundation on the 25 March 421, the feast of the Annunciation.

Culminating in the Last Judgment over the main portal, the sequence of mosaics in the lateral lunettes of the upper register present scenes of Christ's victory over death: from left to right, the Descent from the Cross, the Harrowing of Hell, the Resurrection, and the Ascension. The central lunette was originally blind and may have been pierced by several smaller windows; the present large window was inserted after the fire of 1419 destroyed the earlier structure. The reliefs of Christ and the Four Evangelists, now inserted into the northern façade, may also survive from the original decoration of the central lunette.

The four gilded bronze horses were among the early spoils brought from Constantinople after the Fourth Crusade. They were part of a quadriga adorning the Hippodrome and are the only equestrian team to survive from classical Antiquity. In the mid-thirteenth century, they were installed prominently on the main façade of St Mark's as symbols of Venice's military triumph over Byzantium and of its newfound imperial status as the successor of the Byzantine Empire. Since 1974 the original four horses are preserved inside, having been substituted with copies on the balcony over the central portal.

==== Northern façade ====
The aediculae on the northern façade contain statues of the four original Latin Doctors of the Church: Jerome, Augustine, Ambrose, and Gregory the Great. Allegorical figures of Prudence, Temperance, Faith, and Charity top the lunettes.

==== Southern façade ====
The Gothic crowning continues in the upper register of the southern façade, the lunettes being topped with the allegorical figures of Justice and Fortitude and the aediculae housing statues of Saint Anthony Abbot and Saint Paul the Hermit.

The southern façade is the most richly encrusted façade with rare marbles, spoils, and trophies, including the so-called pillars of Acre, the statue of the four tetrarchs embedded into the external wall of the treasury, and the porphyry imperial head on the south-west corner of the balcony, traditionally believed to represent Justinian II and popularly identified as Francesco Bussone da Carmagnola.

After a section of the narthex was partitioned off between 1100 and 1150 to create an entry hall, the niche that had previously marked the southern end of the narthex was removed, and the corresponding arch on the southern façade was opened to establish a second entry. Like the entry on the western façade, the passage was distinguished with precious porphyry columns. On either side, couchant lions and griffins were placed. Presumably, the southern entry was also flanked by the two carved pillars long believed to have been brought to Venice from the Genoese quarter in St Jean d'Acre as booty of the first Venetian–Genoese war (1256–1270) but actually spoils of the Fourth Crusade, taken from the Church of St Polyeuctus in Constantinople.

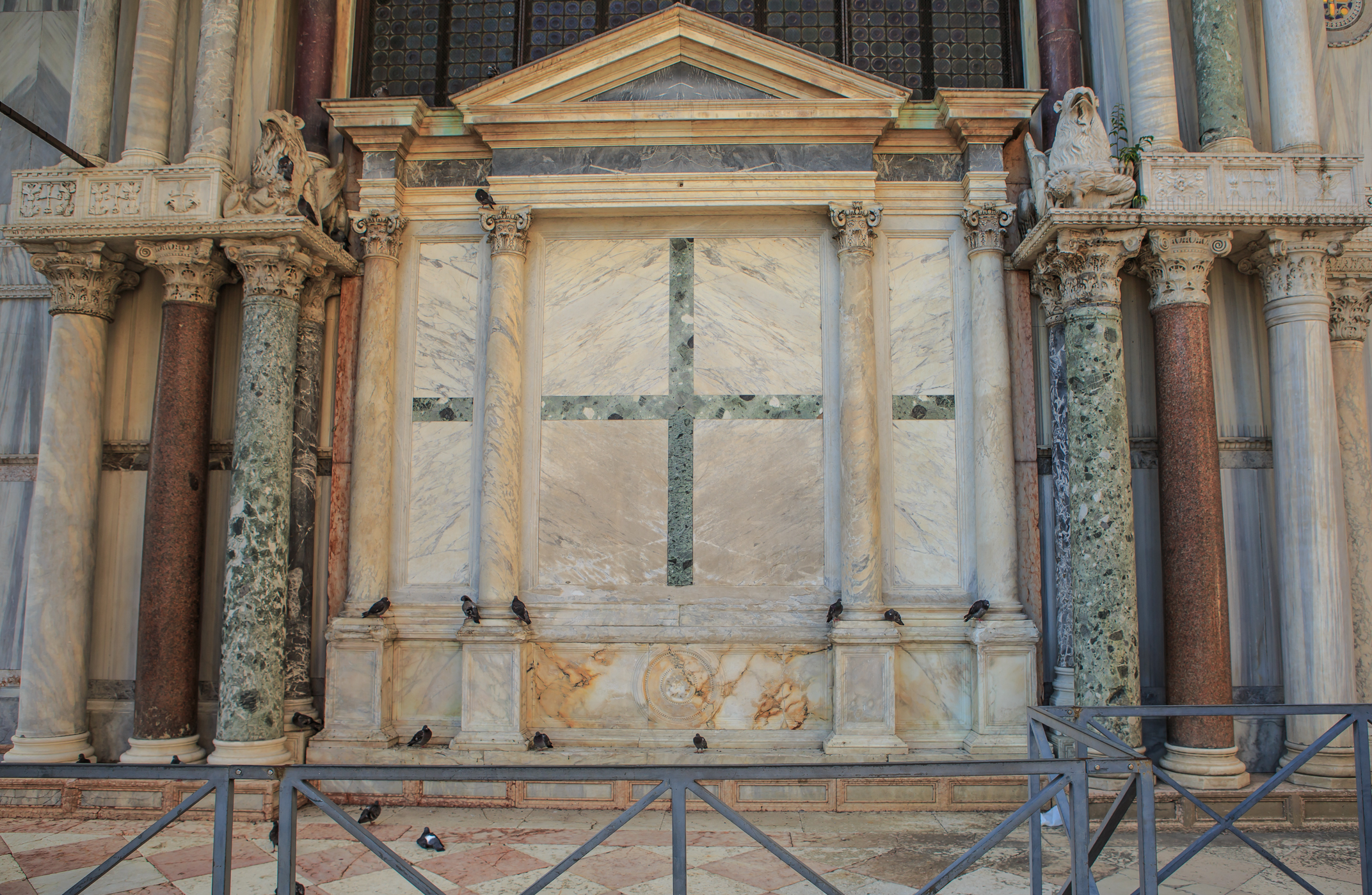
Former southern entry

Between 1503 and 1515, the entry hall was transformed into the funerary chapel of Giovanni Battista Cardinal Zen, bishop of Vicenza, who had bequeathed a large portion of his wealth to the Venetian Republic, asking to be entombed in St Mark's. The southern entrance was consequently closed, blocked by the altar and a window above, and although the griffins remain, much of the decoration was transferred or destroyed. The pillars were moved slightly eastward.

=== Entry hall (Zen Chapel) ===
The decoration of the southern entry hall to the church was redone in the thirteenth century in conjunction with work in the adjoining narthex; of the original appearance of the entry hall, nothing is known. The present mosaic cycle in the barrel vault forms the prelude to the mosaic cycle on the main façade, which narrates the translation of Saint Mark's relics from Alexandria in Egypt to Venice. The events depicted include the praedestinatio, the angelic prophecy that Mark would one day be buried in Venice, which affirms Venice's divine right to possess the relics. The authority of Saint Mark is demonstrated in the scenes that show the writing of his Gospel which is then presented to Saint Peter. Particular relevance is also given to the departure of Saint Mark for Egypt and his miracles there, which creates continuity with the opening scene on the façade, depicting the removal of the body from Alexandria.

Although largely redone in the nineteenth century, the apse above the doorway that leads into the narthex probably maintains the overall aspect of the decoration from the first half of the twelfth century with the Virgin flanked by angels, a theme common in middle-Byzantine churches.

=== Interior ===
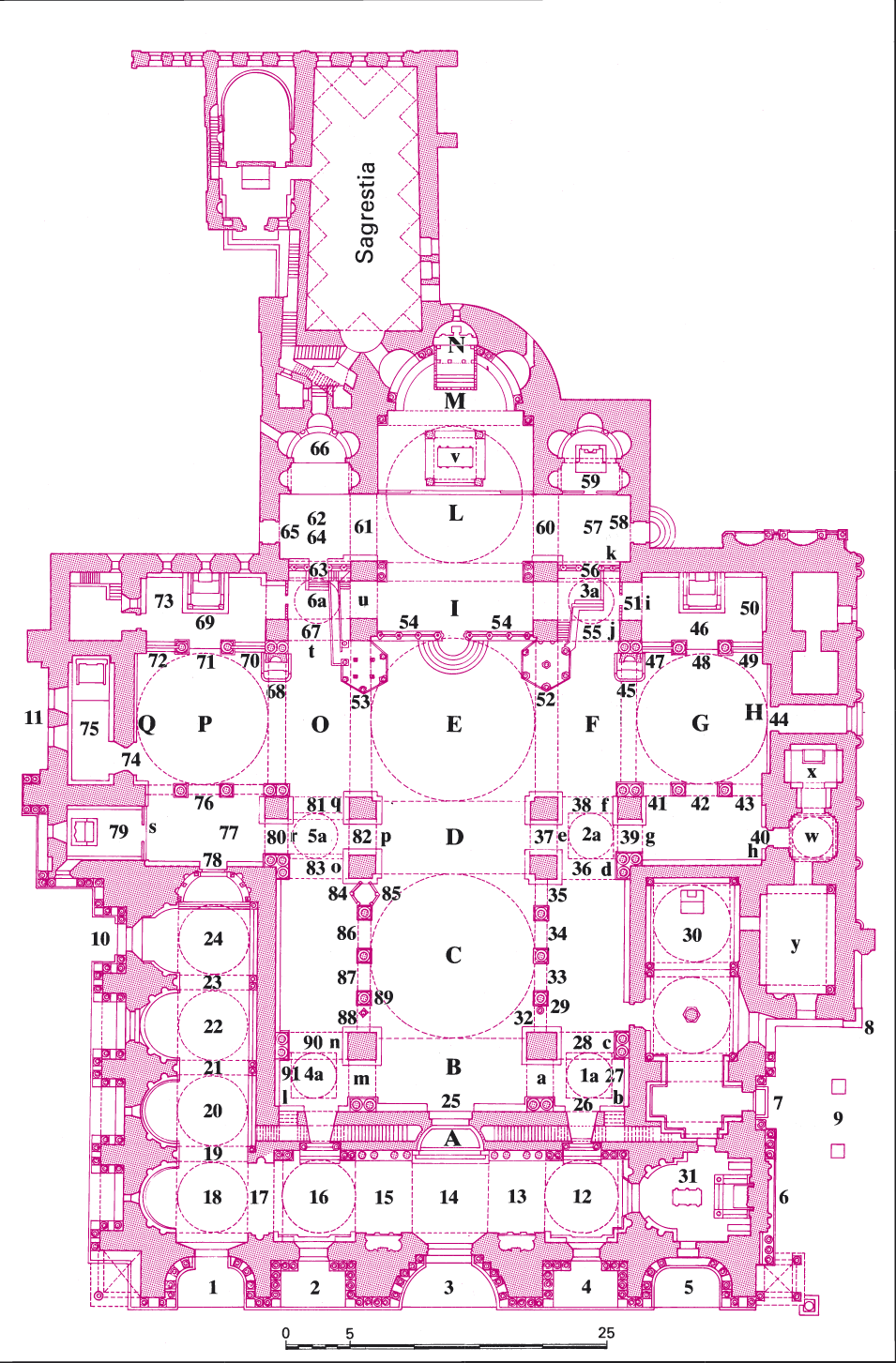
Plan of the church

Although St Mark's was modelled after the Church of the Holy Apostles in Constantinople, ceremonial needs and limitations posed by the pre-existing walls and foundations made it necessary to adapt the design. The cruciform plan with five domes was maintained. However the Holy Apostles was a true centrally planned church: the central dome, larger than the others, was alone pierced with windows, and the altar was located underneath. There was no distinction between the four crossarms: no apse existed and double-tiered arcades surrounded the interior on all sides. In contrast, the longitudinal axis was emphasized to create a space appropriate for processions associated with state ceremonies. Both the central and western domes are larger, accentuating the progression along the nave, and by means of a series of increasingly smaller arches, the nave visually narrows towards the raised chancel in the eastern crossarm, where the altar stands. The crossarms of the transept are shorter and narrower. Optically, their height and width are further reduced by the insertion of arches, supported on double columns within the barrel vaults. The domes of the transept and the chancel are also smaller.

As with the Holy Apostles, each dome rests on four barrel vaults, those of the central dome rising from quadripartite (four-legged) piers. But the two-tiered arcades that reinforced the vaults in the Holy Apostles were modified. In St Mark's there are no upper arcades, and as a result the aisles are less isolated from the central part of the church. The effect is of more unified sense of space and an openness that have parallels in other Byzantine churches constructed in the eleventh century, an indication that the chief architect was influenced by middle-Byzantine architectural models in addition to the sixth-century Church of the Holy Apostles.

==== Chancel and choir chapels ====
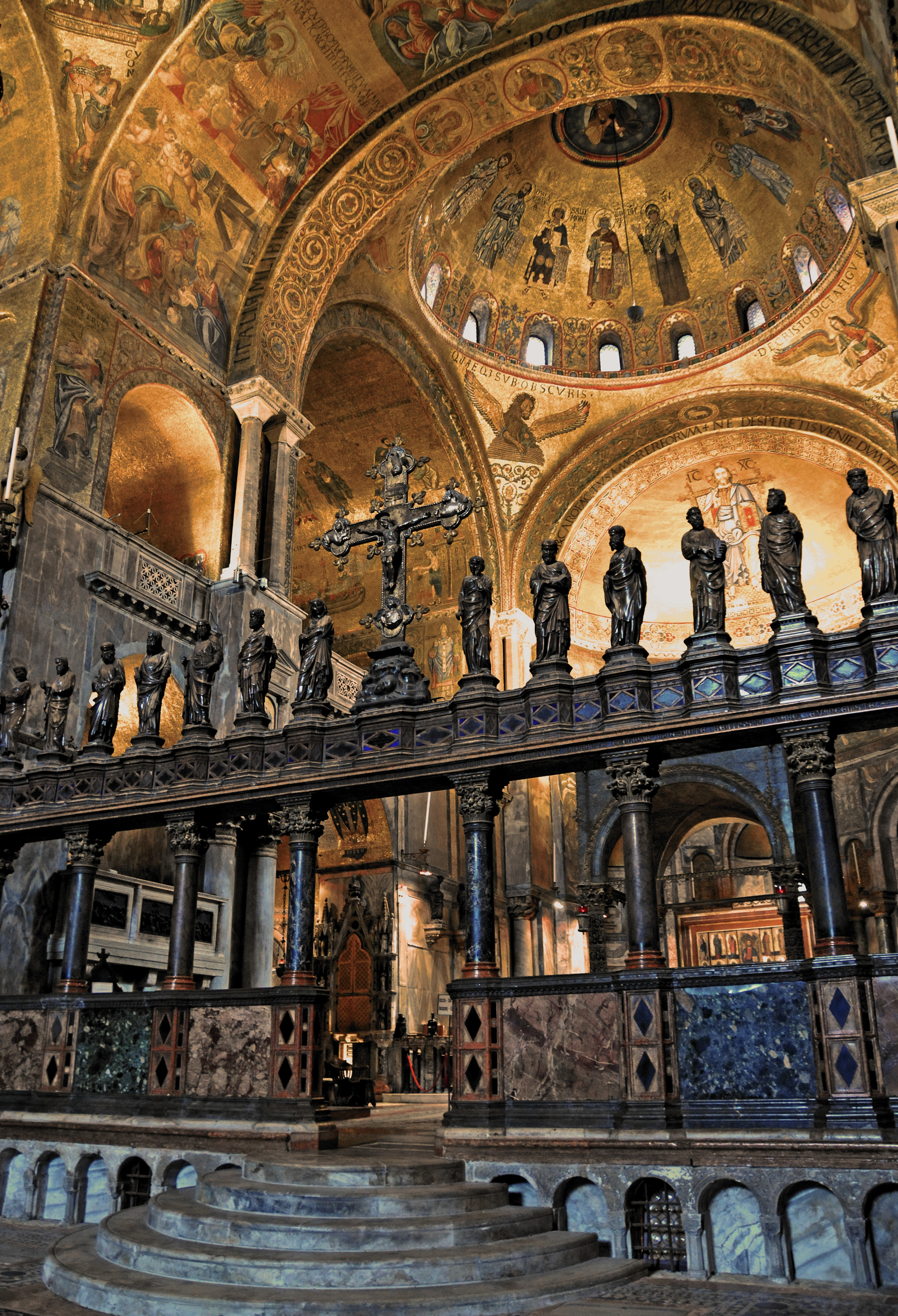
Entry to the chancel with the Dome of Immanuel above the high altar

The chancel is enclosed by a Gothic altar screen, dated 1394. It is surmounted by a bronze and silver Crucifix, flanked by statues of the Virgin and Saint Mark, together with the Twelve Apostles. On the left of the screen is the ambo for readings from Scripture, while on the right is the platform from which the newly elected Doge was presented to the people.

Behind, marble banisters mark the limit of the choir, which after the reorganization by Doge Andrea Gritti (in office 1523–1538) was utilized by the Doge, civic leaders, and foreign ambassadors. Prior to the sixteenth century, the Doge's throne was located near the choir chapel of Saint Clement I, whose doorway opened to the courtyard of the Doge's Palace. The chapel was reserved for the Doge's private use. From the window above, which communicates with his private apartments, it was also possible for the Doge to assist at mass in the church.

The tribunes on either side of the chancel are faced with bronze reliefs that portray events in the life of Saint Mark and his miracles. Beyond the banisters is the presbytery, reserved for the clergy, with the high altar which since 1835 contains the relics of Saint Mark, previously located in the crypt. The ciborium above the altar is supported by four intricately carved columns with scenes that narrate the lives of Christ and the Virgin. The age and provenance of the columns is disputed, with proposals ranging from sixth-century Byzantium to thirteenth-century Venice. The altarpiece, originally designed as an antependium, is the Pala d'Oro, a masterpiece of Byzantine enamels on gilded silver.

The two choir chapels, located on either side of the chancel, occupy the space corresponding to the lateral aisles in the other crossarms. They are connected to the chancel through archways which also serve to reinforce the barrel vaults supporting the dome above. The choir chapel on the northern side is dedicated to Saint Peter. Historically, it was the principal area for the clergy. The mosaic decoration in the vaults above the chapels largely narrates the life of Saint Mark, including the events of the translatio. They constitute the oldest surviving representation of the transfer of Saint Mark's relics to Venice.

==== Side altars and chapels ====
The side altars in the transept were used primarily by the faithful. In the northern crossarm, the altar was originally dedicated to Saint John the Evangelist: the mosaics in the dome above show the aged figure of Saint John, surrounded by five scenes of his life in Ephesus. The stone relief of Saint John, placed on the eastern wall of the crossarm in the thirteenth century, was later moved to the northern façade of the church, probably when the altar was rededicated in 1617 to the Madonna Nicopeia, a venerated Byzantine icon from the late-eleventh/early-twelfth century.

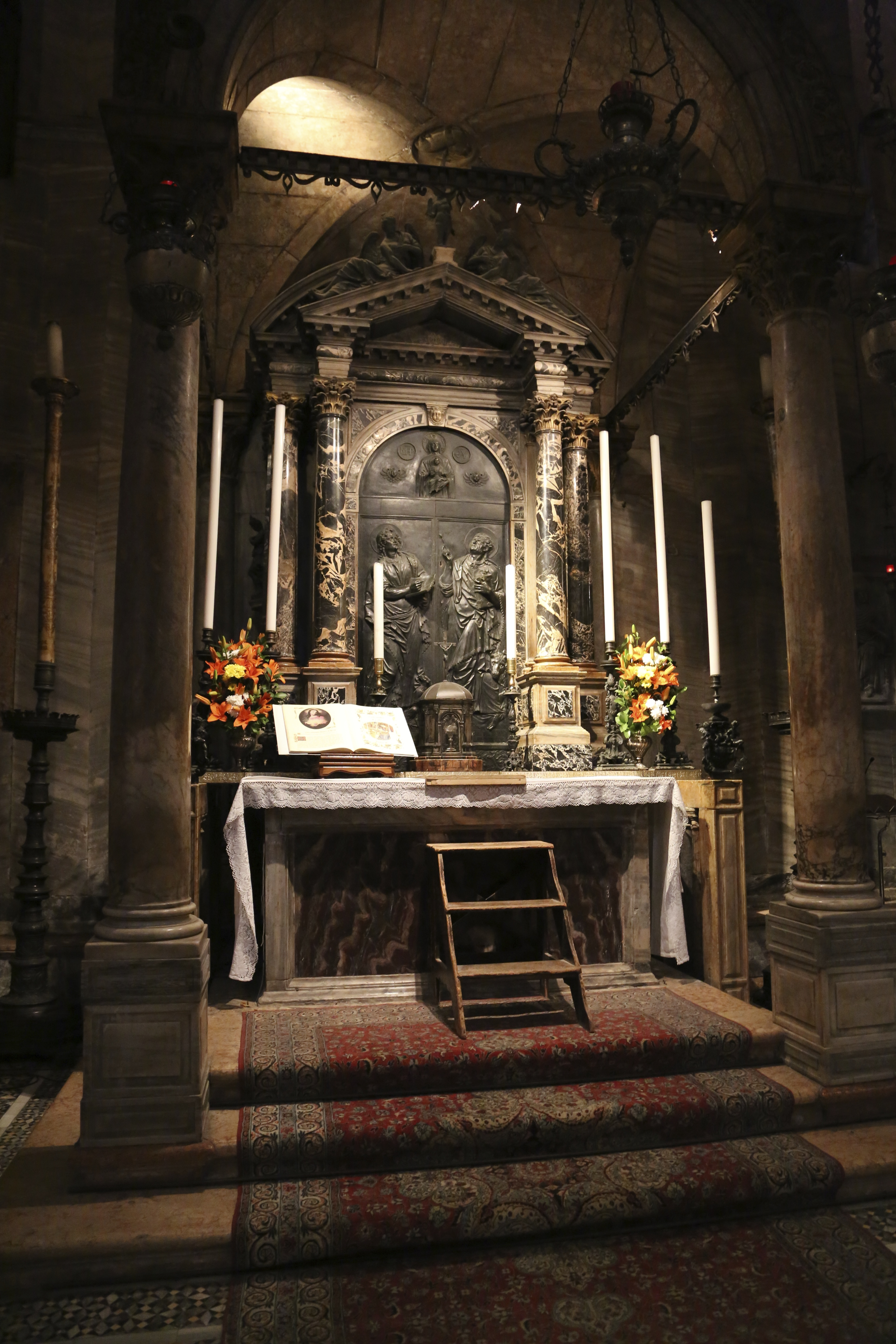
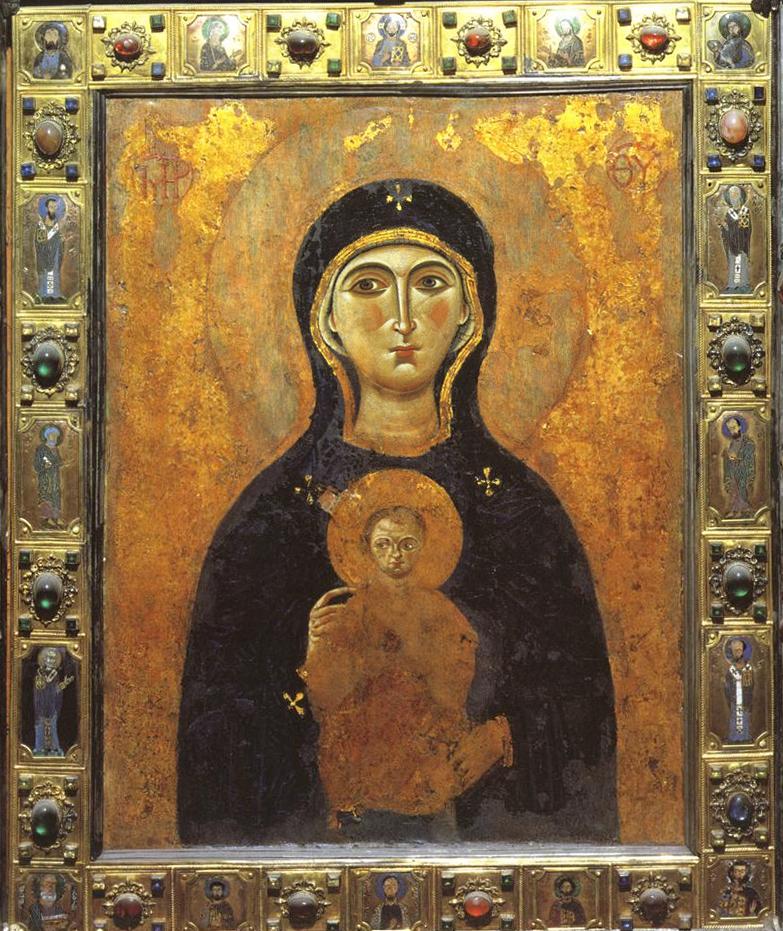
Altar and icon of the Madonna Nicopeia

The date and the circumstances of the icon's arrival in Venice are not documented. Most likely one of many sacred images taken from Constantinople at the time of the Latin Empire, it was deposited in St Mark's treasury, with no specific importance associated. It began to acquire significance for the Venetians in the fourteenth century when it was framed with Byzantine enamels looted from the Pantokrator in Contantinople. At that time, it may have been first carried in public procession to invoke the Virgin's intercession in ridding the city of the Black Death. The icon acquired a political role as the palladium of Venice in the sixteenth century when it came to be identified as the sacred image that had been carried into battle by various Byzantine emperors. In 1589, the icon was transferred to the small Chapel of Saint Isidore where it was made accessible to the public, and subsequently it was placed on the side altar in the northern crossarm. It was first referred to as the Madonna Nicopeia (Nikopoios, Bringer of Victory) in 1645.

The altar in the southern crossarm was initially dedicated to Saint Leonard, the sixth-century Frankish saint who became widely popular at the time of the Crusades as his intercession was sought to liberate prisoners from the Muslims. He is shown in the dome above, together with other saints particularly venerated in Venice: Blaise, Nicholas, and Clement I. The altar was rededicated in 1617 to the True Cross, and since 1810, it has been the Altar of the Blessed Sacrament.

The long-neglected relics of Saint Isidore of Chios, brought to Venice in 1125 by Doge Domenico Michiel (in office 1117–1130) on return from his military expedition in the Aegean, were rediscovered in the mid-fourteenth century, and upon the initiative of Doge Andrea Dandolo (in office 1343–1354), the Chapel of Saint Isidore was constructed between 1348 and 1355 to house them. An annual feast (16 April) was also established in the Venetian liturgical calendar.

The Mascoli Chapel, utilized by the homonymous confraternity after 1618, was decorated under Doge Francesco Foscari (in office 1423–1457) and dedicated in 1430.

Against the piers that support the central dome, on either side of the chancel, Doge Cristoforo Moro (in office 1462–1471) erected at his personal expense two altars dedicated to Saint Paul and Saint James. The pier behind the Altar of Saint James is where the relics of Saint Mark are said to have been rediscovered in 1094: the miraculous event is depicted in the mosaics on the opposite side of the crossarm.

==== Baptistery ====
The date of construction of the baptistery is not known, but it is likely to have been under Doge Giovanni Soranzo (in office 1312–1328), whose tomb is located in the baptistery, an indication that he was responsible for the architectural adaptation. Similarly entombed in the baptistery is Doge Andrea Dandolo who carried out the decorative programme at his personal expense. The mosaics present scenes from the life of Saint John the Baptist on the walls and, in the ante-baptistery, the infancy of Christ. Directly above the bronze font, designed by Sansovino, the dome contains the dispersion of the Apostles, each shown in the act of baptizing a different nationality in reference to Christ's command to preach the Gospel to all people. The second dome, above the altar, presents Christ in glory surrounded by the nine angelic choirs. The altar is a large granite rock, which according to tradition was brought to Venice from Tyre following the Venetian conquest. It is said to be the rock upon which Christ stood to preach to the people of Tyre.

==== Sacristy ====
In 1486, Giorgio Spavento, as proto (consultant architect and buildings manager), designed a new sacristy, connected to both the presbytery and the choir chapel of Saint Peter; the location of the earlier sacristy is not known. It was Spavento's first project and the only one he oversaw to completion. Decoration began in 1493. The cabinets, used for storing reliquaries, monstrances, vestments, and liturgical objects and books, were inlaid by Antonio della Mola and his brother Paolo and show scenes from the life of Saint Mark. The mosaic decoration of the vault, depicting Old-Testament prophets, was designed by Titian and executed between 1524 and 1530.

Behind the sacristy is the church, also by Spavento, dedicated to Saint Theodore, the first patron saint of Venice. Constructed between 1486 and 1493 in an austere Renaissance style, it served as the private chapel for the canons of the basilica and, later, as the seat of the Venetian Inquisition.

=== Influence ===
As the state church, St Mark's was a point of reference for Venetian architects. Its influence during the Gothic period seems to have been limited to decorative patterns and details, such as the portal and painted wall decoration in the Church of Santo Stefano and the portal of the Church of the Madonna dell'Orto, consisting of an ogee arch with flame-like relief sculpture reminiscent of the crockets on St Mark's.

In the early Renaissance, despite the introduction of classical elements into Venetian architecture by Lombard stonecutters, faithfulness to local building traditions remained strong. In the façades of Ca' Dario and the Church of Santa Maria dei Miracoli, surface decoration in emulation of St Mark's is the principal characteristic, and the overall effect derives from the rich encrustation of shimmering coloured marbles and the circular patterns, derived from the basilica. Similarly, the Foscari Arch in the courtyard of the Doge's Palace is based on ancient triumphal arches but owes its detailing to the basilica: the superimposed columns clustered together, the Gothic pinnacles, and the crowning statuary. At the Scuola Grande di San Marco, the reference to St Mark's is made in the series of lunettes along the roofline which recalls the profile of the basilica.

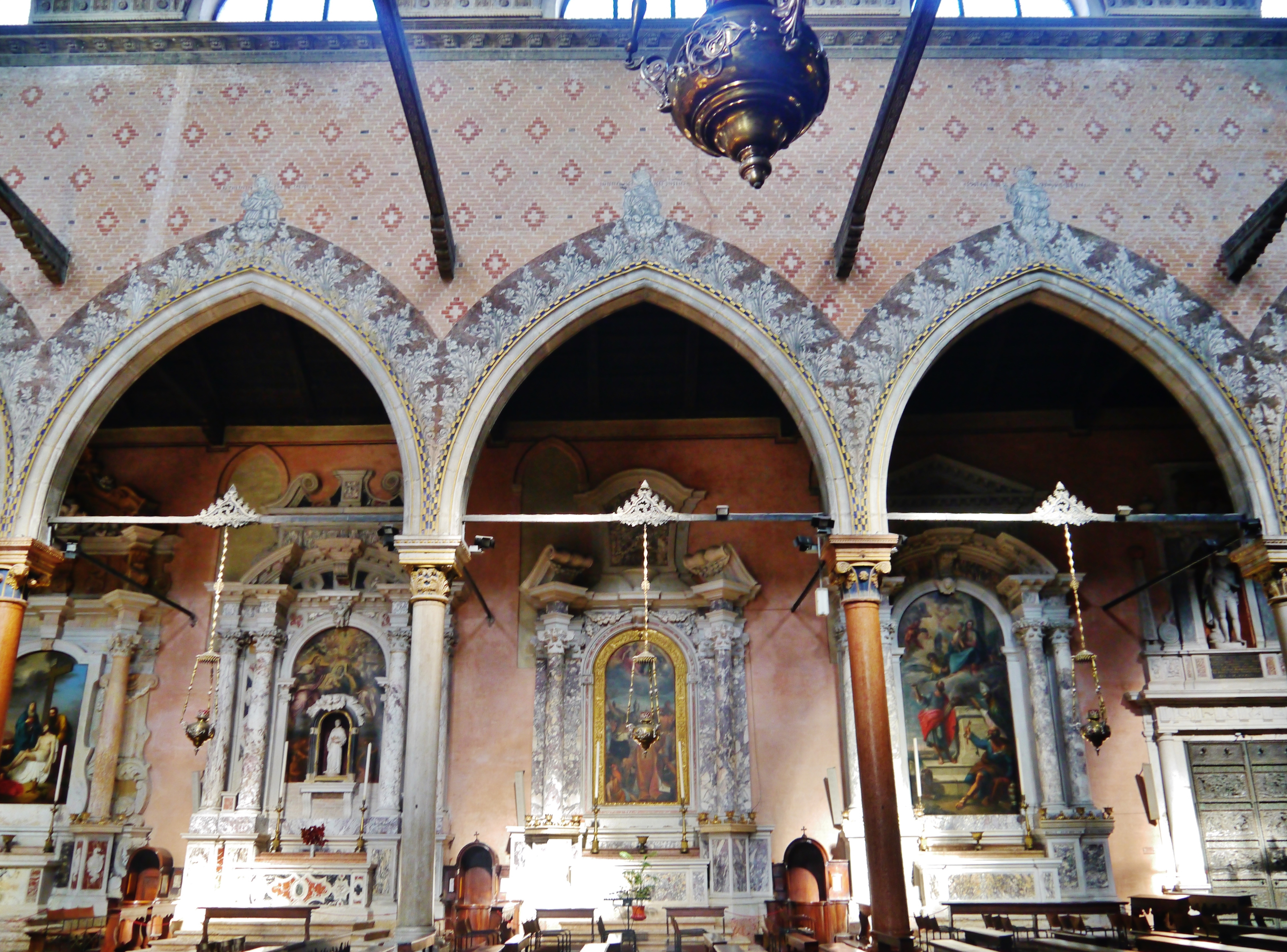
Santo Stefano

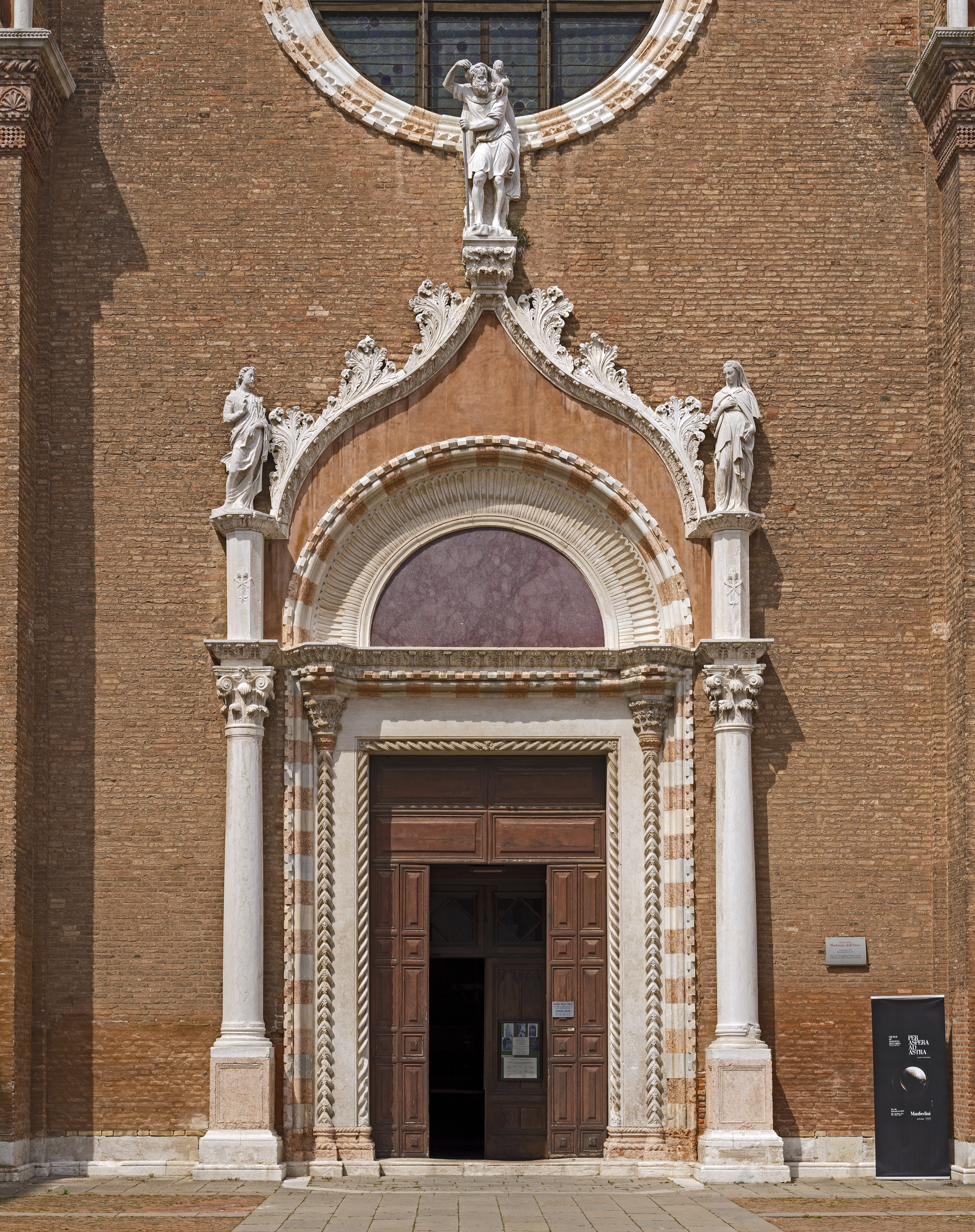
Madonna dell'Orto

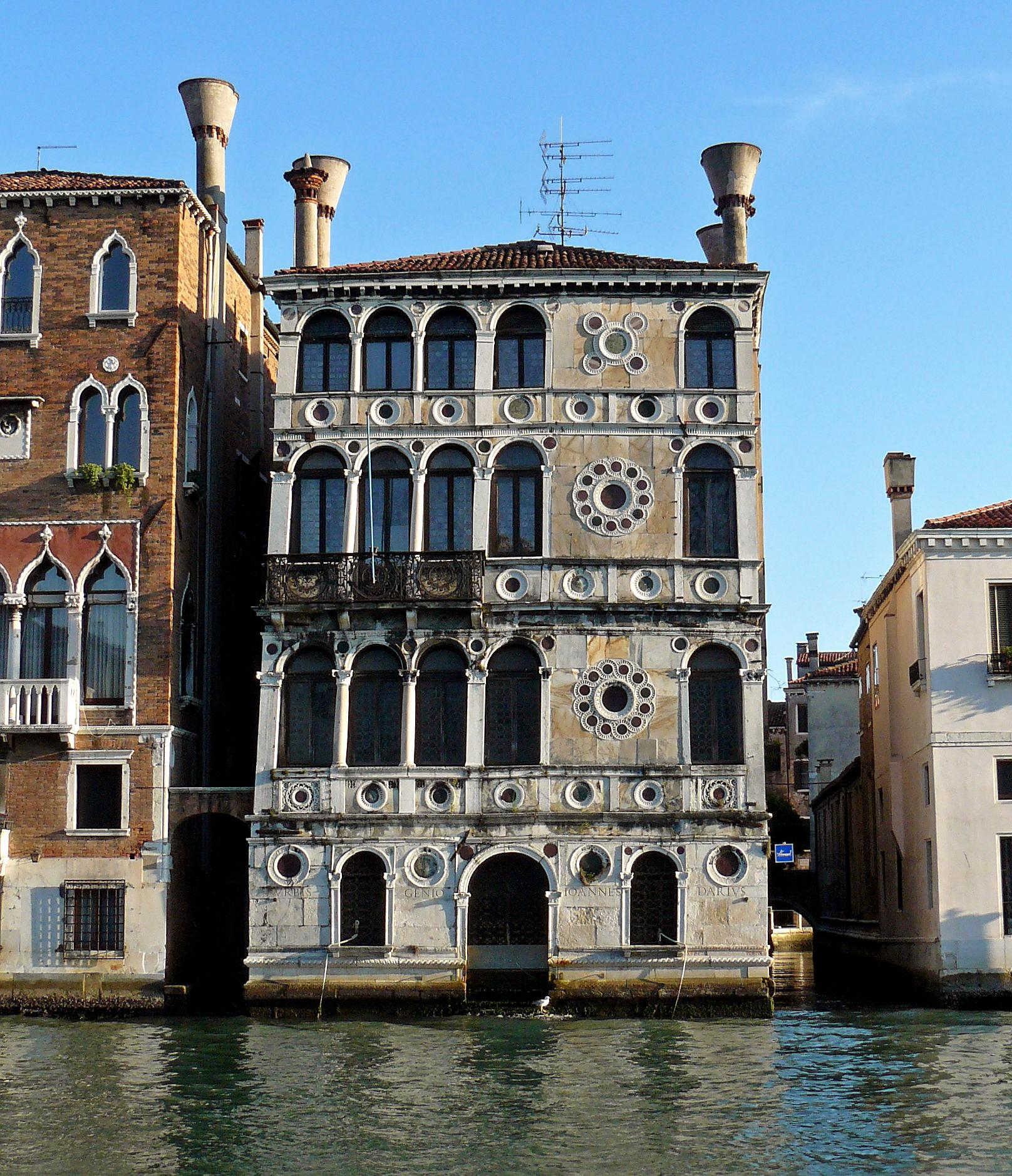
Ca' Dario

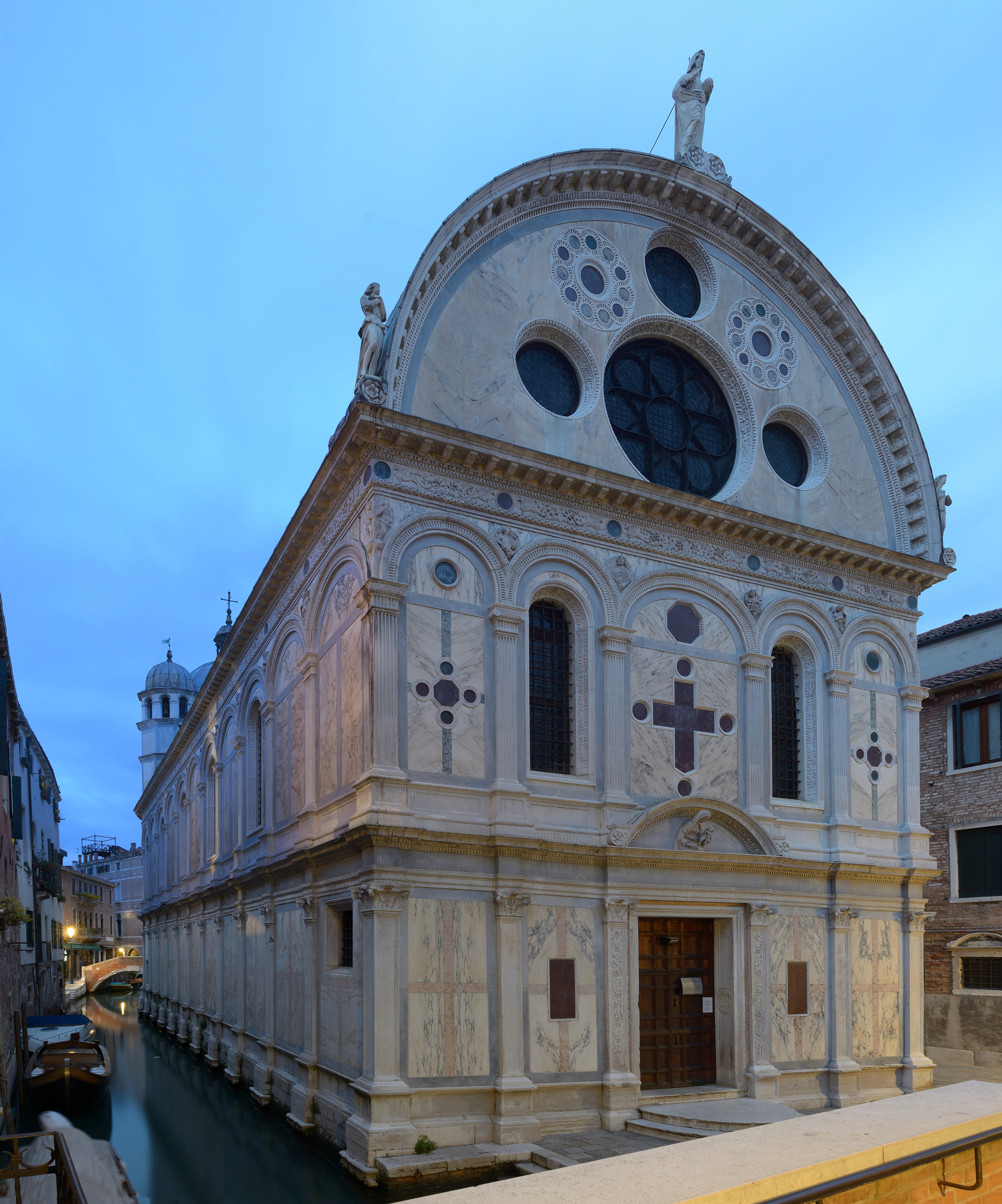
Santa Maria dei Miracoli

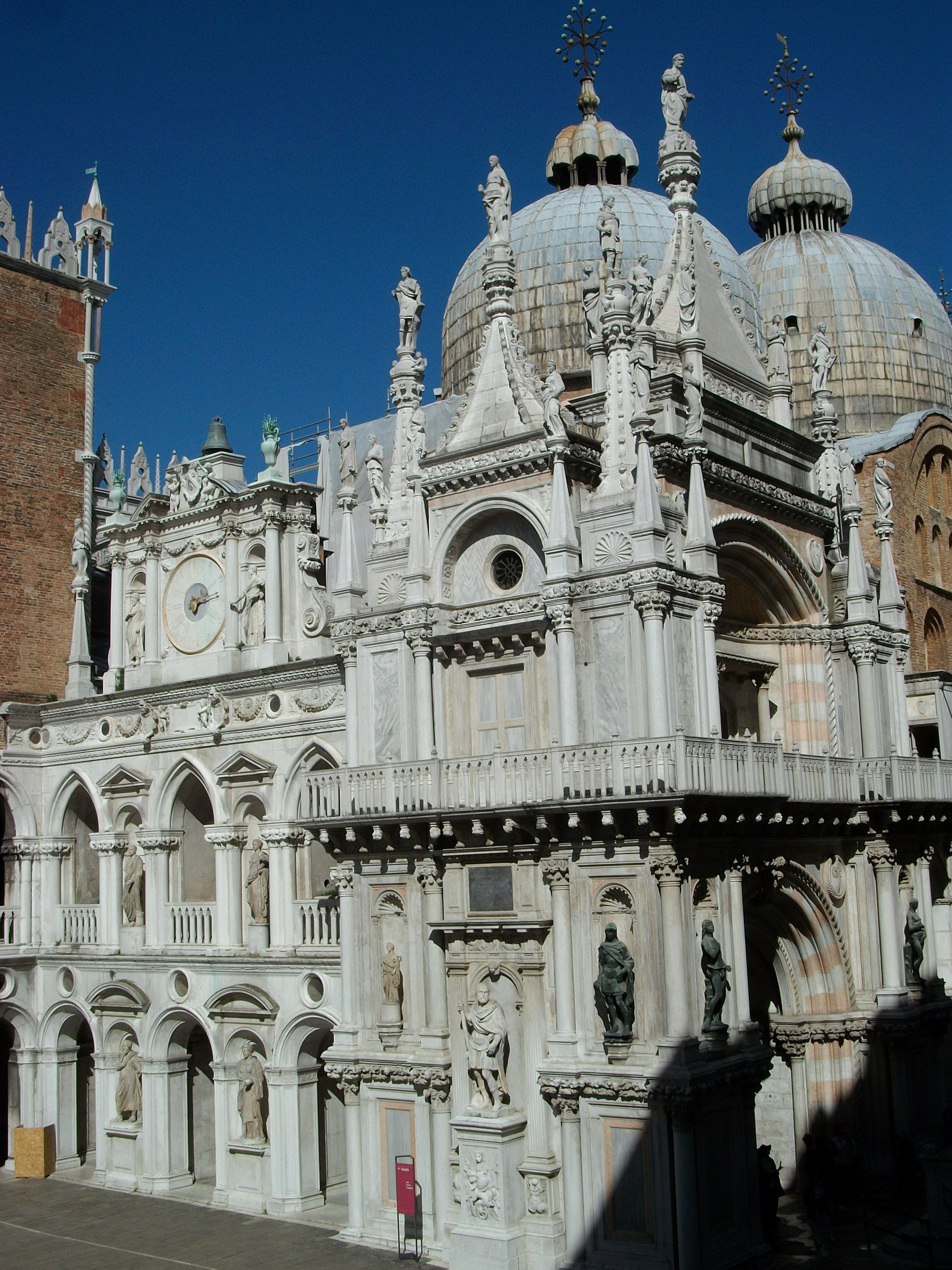
Foscari Arch

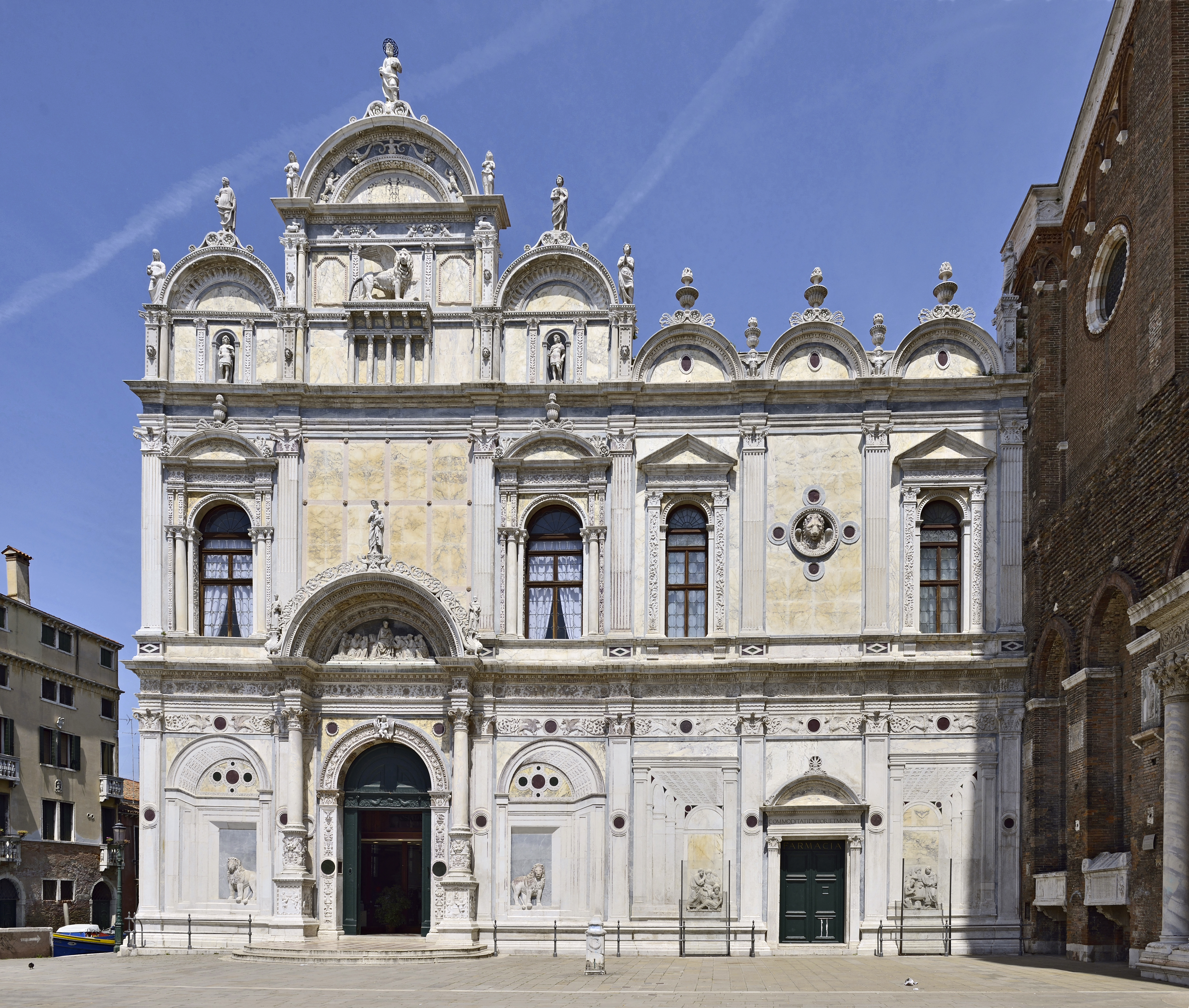
Scuola Grande di San Marco

== Mosaics ==
=== Decorative programme ===
==== Interior ====
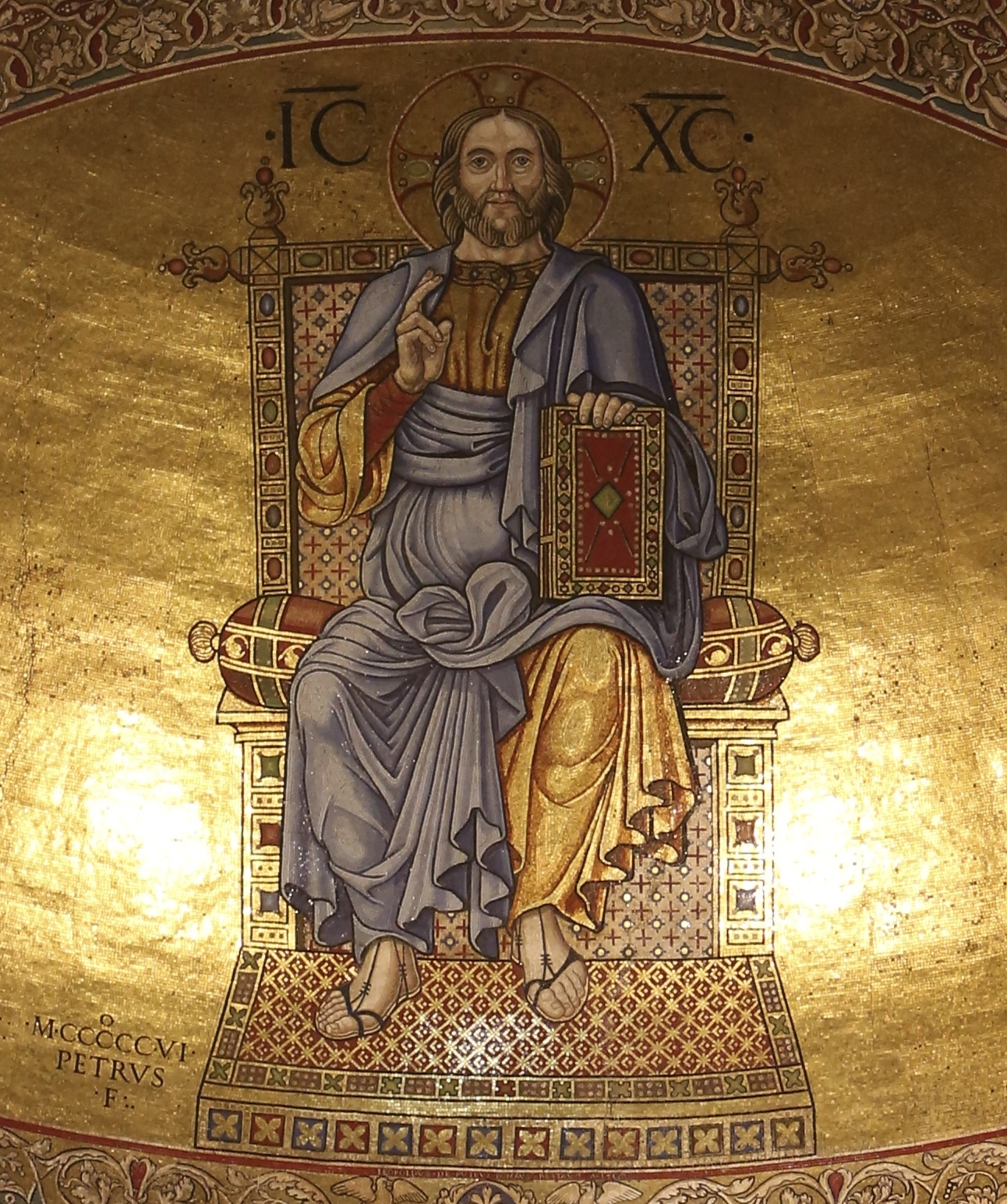
Petrus F., mosaic of Christ Pantocrator in the semi-dome of the apse with the Christogram ICXC (1506)

The location of the main altar within the apse necessarily affected the decorative programme. The Christ Pantocrator, customarily located in the central dome over the altar, was placed in the semi-dome of the apse. Below, interspersed with three windows, are late-eleventh and early-twelfth-century mosaics that portray Saint Nicholas of Myra, Saint Peter, Saint Mark, and Saint Hermagoras of Aquileia as the protectors and patrons of the state, Saint Nicholas being specifically the protector of seafarers.

Over the high altar in the eastern crossarm is the Dome of Immanuel (God with us). It presents a young Christ in the centre, surrounded by stars. Radially arranged underneath are standing figures of the Virgin and Old-Testament prophets, the latter bearing scrolls with passages that largely refer to the Incarnation. Rather than seraphim as was customary in middle-Byzantine churches, the pendentives of the dome show the symbols of the Four Evangelists.

An extensive cycle narrating the Life of Christ covers much of the interior, with the principal events located along the longitudinal axis. The eastern vault, between the central dome and the chancel, contains the major events of the infancy (Annunciation, Adoration of the Magi, Presentation in the Temple) along with the Baptism of Christ and the Transfiguration. The western vault depicts the events of the Passion of Jesus on one side (the kiss of Judas, the trial before Pilate, and the Crucifixion) and the Resurrection on the other side (the Harrowing of Hell and the post-resurrection appearances). A secondary series illustrating Christ's miracles is located in the transepts. The series seems to have derived from an eleventh-century Byzantine Gospel. The transepts also contain a detailed cycle of the Life of the Virgin: these scenes were probably derived from an eleventh-century illuminated manuscript of the Protogospel of James from Constantinople. As a prelude, a Tree of Jesse showing the ancestors of Christ was added to the end wall of the northern crossarm between 1542 and 1551. Throughout the various narrative cycles, Old-Testament prophets are portrayed holding texts that relate to the New-Testament scenes nearby.

The Dome of the Ascension occupies the central position, whereas in the Church of the Holy Apostles it was located over the southern crossarm. The dome, executed in the late twelfth century, is exemplary of middle-Byzantine prototypes in Constantinople. In the centre Christ ascends, accompanied by four angels and surrounded by standing figures of the Virgin, two angels, and the Twelve Apostles. As customary for the central dome in middle-Byzantine churches, the pendentives contain the Four Evangelists, each with his gospel.

As in the Church of the Holy Apostles, the Dome of Pentecost is located over the western crossarm. In the centre is an hetoimasia, an empty throne with a book and dove. Radiating outward are silver rays which fall on the heads of the Apostles seated around the outer rim of the dome, each with a flame on his head. In keeping with Pentecost, as the institution of the Church, the side vaults and walls of the western crossarm largely illustrate the subsequent missionary activities of the Apostles and their deaths as martyrs. The specific events in the lives of the various Apostles and the manner of their deaths adhere to Western traditions, as narrated in Latin martyrologies that derive in part from the Book of Acts but to a greater extent from apocryphal sources. However, the single representations and the overall concept of presenting the lives of the saints in a composition that combines several events together in one scene have their parallels in Greek manuscript illustrations of the middle-Byzantine period.

The western vault illustrates Saint John's vision of the Apocalypse and the Last Judgement. On the wall below there is a thirteenth-century deesis with Christ enthroned between the Virgin and Saint Mark.

==== Narthex ====
The decorative programme of the western and northern wings of the narthex seems to have been planned in its entirety in the thirteenth century when the eleventh-century narthex was extended along the northern and southern sides of the western crossarm. However, a stylistic change in the mosaics is evident in the northern wing, indicating that the execution of the programme was interrupted, presumably to await the completion of the vaulting system.

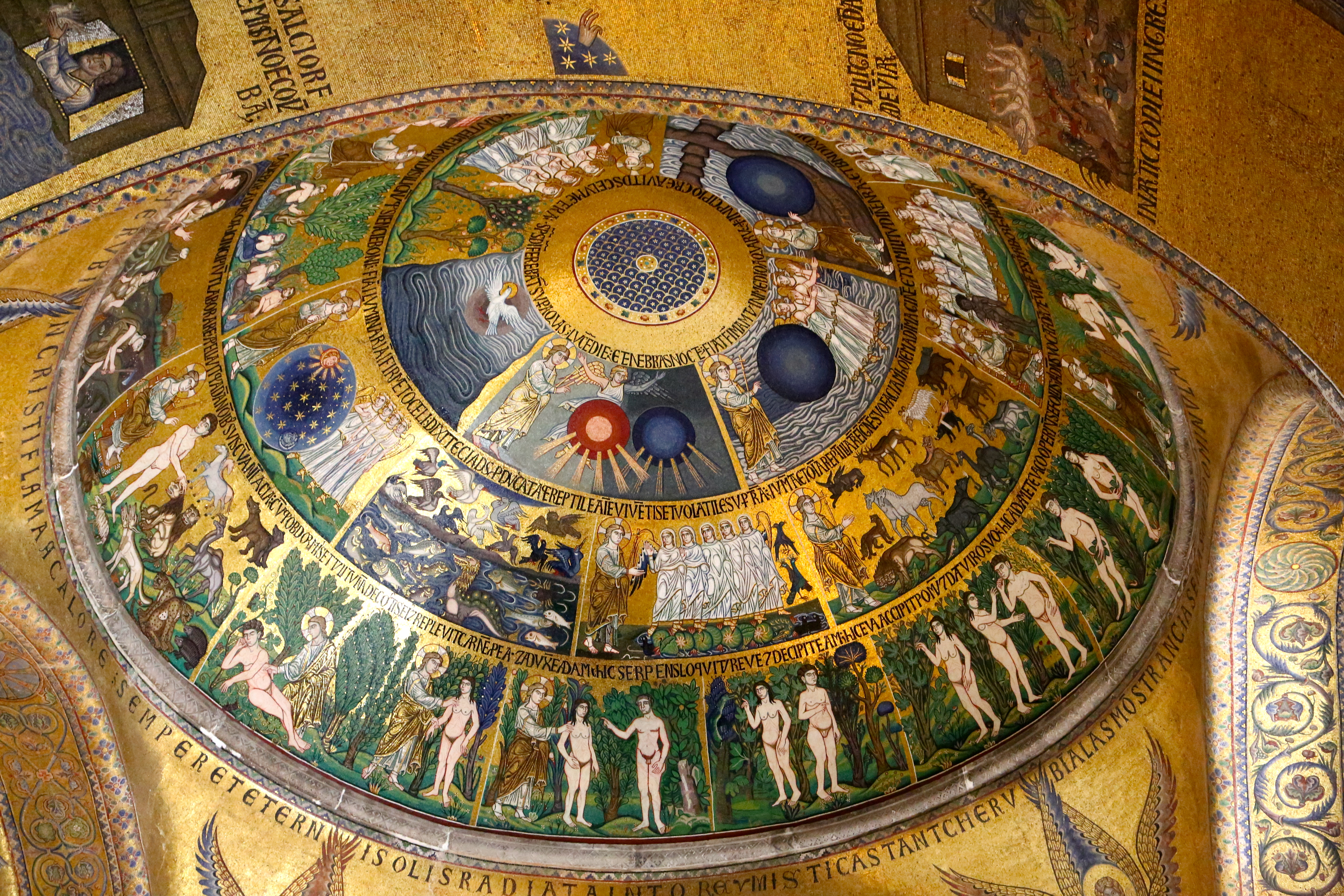
The Dome of the Creation in the narthex (thirteenth century)

Unlike in middle-Byzantine churches where the theme of the Last Judgement is often represented in the narthex, the decorative programme narrates the stories of Genesis and Exodus: the main subjects are the Creation and the Tower of Babel along with the lives of Noah, Abraham, Joseph, and Moses. Special emphasis is given to the stories of the sacrifice of Abel and the hospitality of Abraham, located prominently in the lunettes on either side of the entry to the church, due to the analogies with Christ's death and the Eucharistic meal.

It has long been recognized that the individual scenes are very close to those of the Cotton Genesis, an important fourth or fifth-century Greek illuminated manuscript copy of the Book of Genesis: about a hundred of the 359 miniatures in the manuscript were used. Of Egyptian origin, the manuscript may have reached Venice as a result of the commercial relations of the Venetians in the Eastern Mediterranean or as booty of the Fourth Crusade. The sixth-century Vienna Genesis was also in Venice in the early thirteenth century and may have influenced artistic choices. With regard to the Dome of Moses, the scenes most closely resemble Palaeologan art, suggesting an unknown manuscript from the third quarter of the thirteenth century as the iconographic source.

While the Byzantine renderings of the Old-Testament stories in illuminated manuscripts provided suitable models, Byzantine churches themselves did not generally give importance to the Old Testament in their decoration, considering the stories to be shadows of the history of salvation, inferior to the reality of the New Testament. The impetus for the Venetians to choose the Old Testament as the theme of the narthex was instead of western derivation and reflected an interest that had developed in Rome beginning in the late eleventh century.

The narration begins in correspondence to the former southern entry of the church with the Dome of the Creation, which opens with the spirit of God hovering above the waters and concludes with Adam and Eve cast out from the Garden of Eden. As in the Cotton Genesis, Christ is portrayed as the agent of creation. Underneath, the pendentives contain cherubim, the guardians of Eden, and the lunettes illustrate the story of Cain and Abel. The stories of Noah and of the Tower of Babel with the confusion of tongues and the dispertion of the nations occupy the vaults on either side of the entry to the church. The story of Abraham, from the calling of the patriarch to the circumcision of Isaac, is narrated in a single dome and the two lunettes underneath, whereas the story of Joseph, the most extensive, occupies the next three domes. The story of Moses, until the Crossing of the Red Sea, is limited to the final bay.

=== Style ===
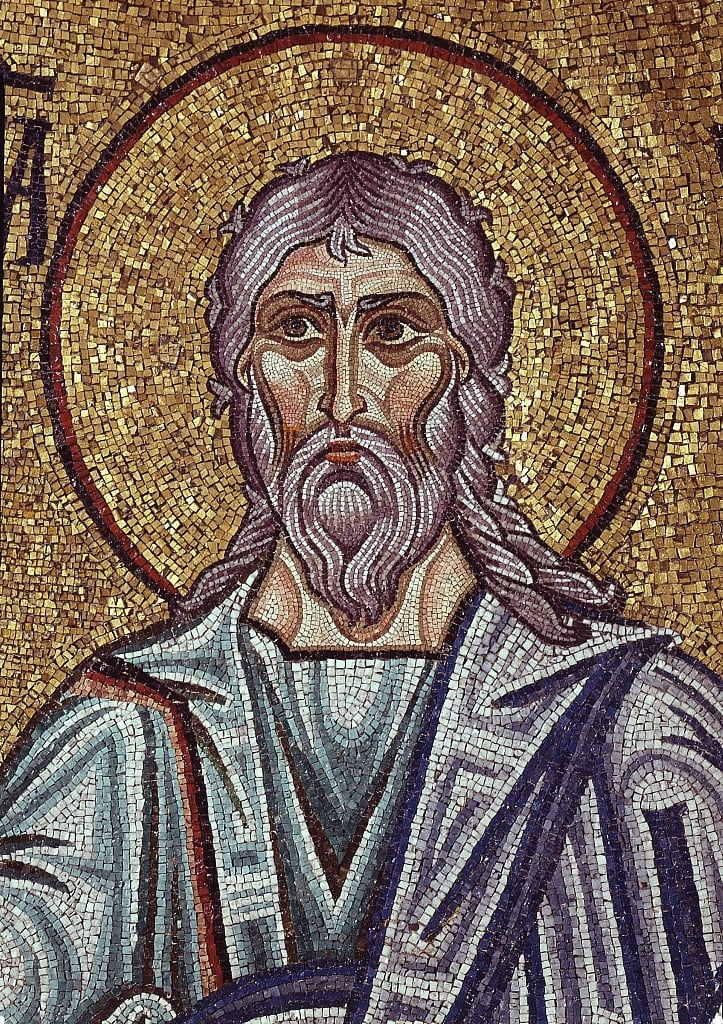
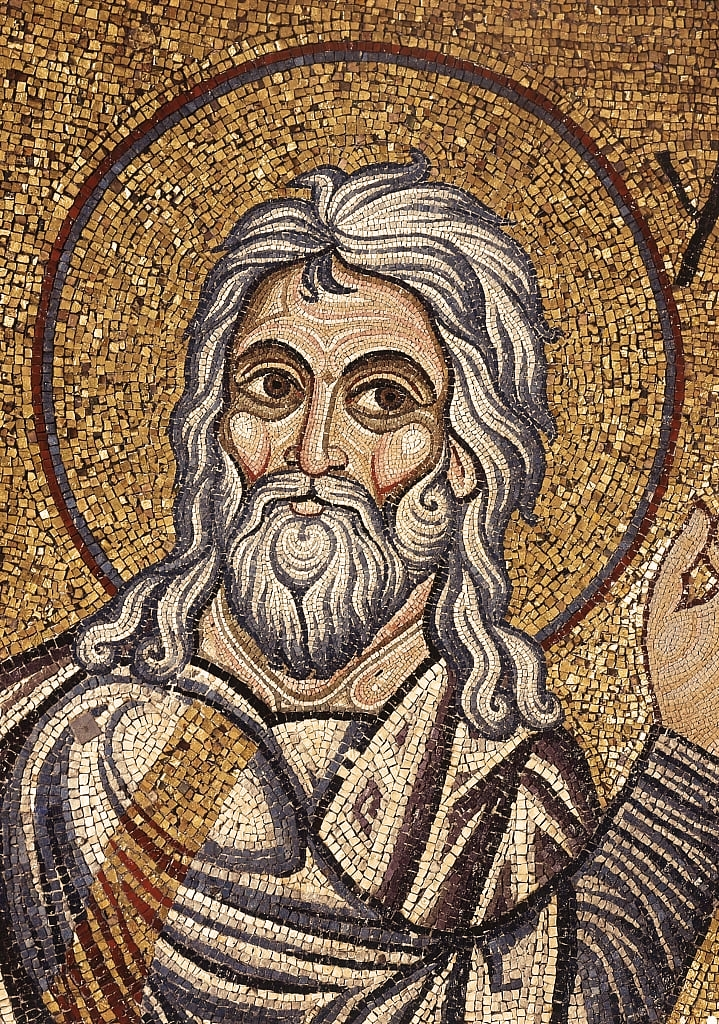
Mosaics in the Dome of Immanuel: the prophet Jeremiah, dating to the first quarter of the twelfth century, (left) and the prophet Isaiah, probably executed between 1170 and 1180 (right)

The oldest mosaics in St Mark's, located in the niches of the entry porch in the narthex, may date to as early as 1070. Although Byzantine in style, they are somewhat antiquated with respect to contemporary trends in Byzantium. Most likely, they were executed by mosaicists who had left Constantinople in the mid-eleventh century to work on the Torcello Cathedral and then remained in the local area. More modern but still archaic in style are the figures in the main apse which were done in the late-eleventh and early-twelfth centuries.

The most important period of decoration was the twelfth century when Venice's relations with Byzantium alternated between political tensions that limited artistic influence from the East and moments of intense trade and cooperation that favoured the Venetians' awareness of eastern prototypes as well as the influx of Byzantine mosaicists and materials. The three figures in the Dome of Immanuel that date to the first quarter of the century (Jeremiah, Hosea, and Habakkuk) are the work of highly skilled mosaicists, likely Greek-trained. They demonstrate the greater classicism and realism of middle-Byzantine painting in Constantinople but also local trends in the harsher and broken lines. In succeeding phases of work in the choir chapels and the transept, Byzantine miniatures were copied more or less faithfully for the mosaics, but any eastern influence that could reflect the latest artistic developments in Constantinople is hardly traceable. A new and direct awareness of artistic developments in Constantinople is indicated in the Dome of Pentecost, executed sometime in the first half of the twelfth century.

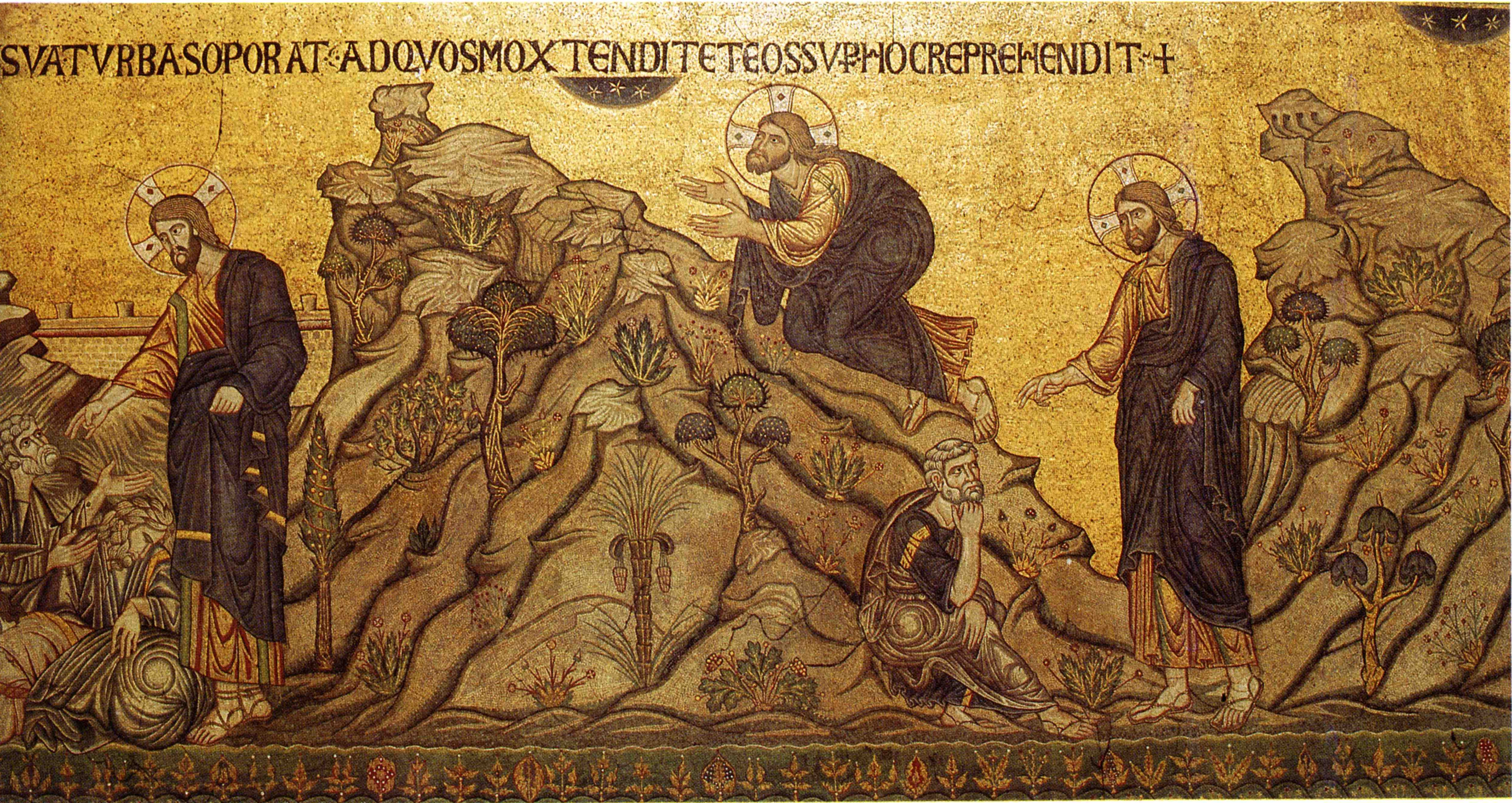
Mosaic in the right lateral nave depicting the Agony in the Garden (early thirteenth century)

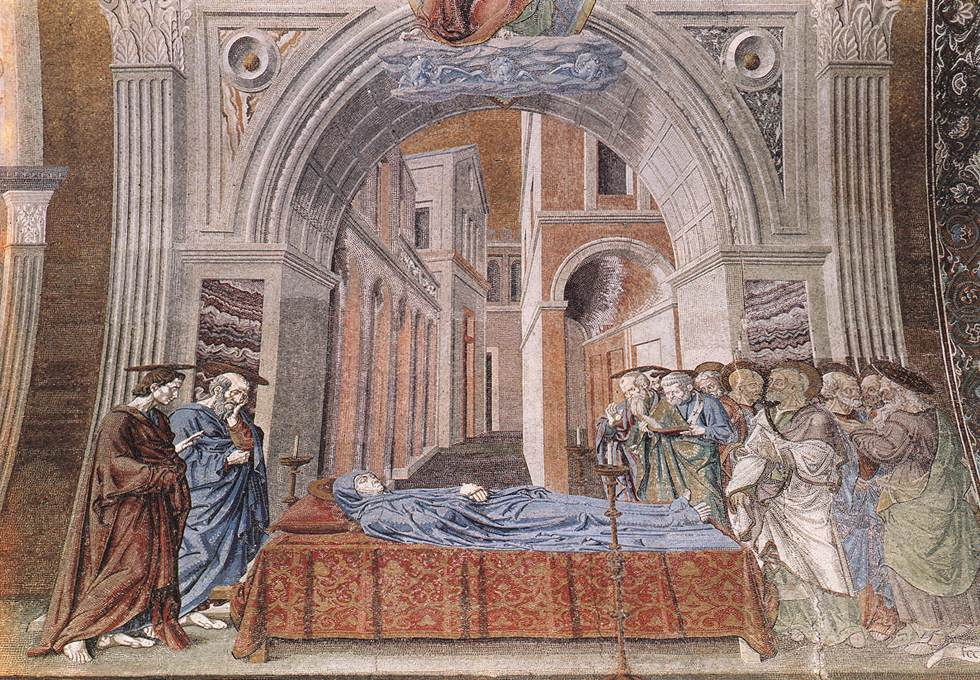
Andrea del Castagno, attributed (cartoon), mosaic in the Mascoli Chapel depicting the Dormition of the Virgin (1448?)

In the last third of the twelfth century, a large portion of the mosaics in the Dome of Immanuel and the entirety of the Dome of the Ascension and of several vaults in the western crossarm had to be completely redone in consequence of a catastrophic event, the nature and date of which are not known. Local influence is evident. But the more vigorous poses, agitated draperies, expressiveness, and heightened contrast show the partial assimilation of the developing dynamic style in Constantinople. The mosaics in the Dome of the Ascension and those depicting the Passion in the nearby vault represent the maturity of the Venetian mosaic school and are one of the great achievements of Medieval art.

After the removal of the galleries, the mosaic decoration was extended onto the lower walls, beginning in the thirteenth century. The first mosaic, depicting the Agony in the Garden, represents a synthesizing of various traditions, both eastern and western. Traces remain of the complicated patterns of the late Komnenian period. But the statuesque quality of the figures, which are also more rounded, reflect contemporary developments in Byzantine art such as can be seen at Studenica Monastery. Concurrently, an elegance associated with western Gothic appears and is fused with the Byzantine traditions. The Gothic influence becomes more pronounced in later mosaics of the period with patterned backgrounds that derive from the stained-glass windows in French churches.

The interior mosaics were apparently complete by the 1270s, with work on the narthex continuing into the 1290s. Although some activity must have still been underway in 1308 when the Great Council allowed a glass furnace on Murano to produce mosaic material for St Mark's during the summer, by 1419 no competent mosaicist remained to repair the extensive damage to the main apse and western dome caused by a fire that year. The Venetian government had to consequently seek assistance from the Signoria of Florence which sent Paolo Uccello. Other Florentine artists, including Andrea del Castagno, were also active in St Mark's in the mid-fifteenth century, introducing a sense of perspective largely achieved with architectural settings. In this same period, Michele Giambono executed mosaics.

By the time a new fire in 1439 made repairs once again necessary, a number of Venetian mosaicists had been trained. Some of the replacement mosaics they created show a Florentine influence; others reflect Renaissance developments in the detailing and the modelling of the figures. But overall the replacement mosaics in this period closely imitated the design of the damaged works and were intended to look medieval.

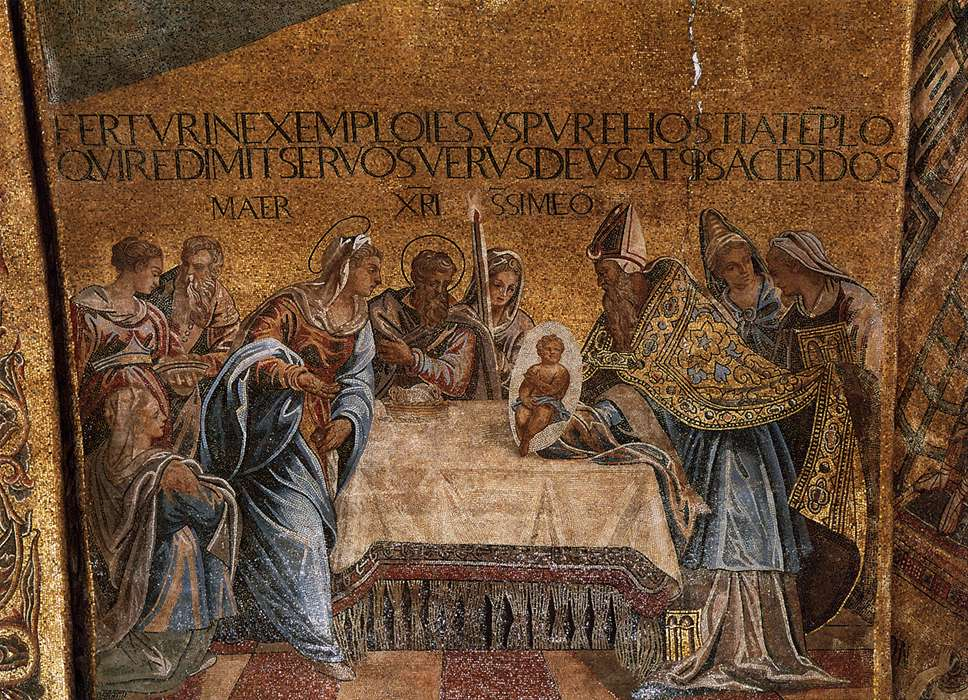
Tintoretto workshop (cartoon), mosaic in the central nave depicting the Presentation of Jesus at the Temple (sixteenth century)

Efforts to maintain the stylistic integrity of the medieval works whenever repairs and restorations became necessary were largely abandoned in the sixteenth century. Often in the absence of any need to restore mosaics but under the sole pretense of replacing old mosaics with Renaissance and Mannerist ones, renowned artists such as Titian, Tintoretto, Paolo Veronese, Giuseppe Salviati, Palma Giovane increasingly competed for work in the church, preparing preliminary sketches for 'modern' mosaics, considered artistically superior, with little attempt to stylistically integrate the new figures and scenes into the older compositions.

In addition to damage from fire and earthquake as well as from the vibrations that resulted whenever cannon were fired in salute from ships in the lagoon, the normal decay of the underlying masonry made it necessary to repeatedly repair the mosaics. In 1716, Leopoldo dal Pozzo, a mosaicist from Rome, was commissioned to assume responsibility for the repair and maintenance of the mosaics in St Mark's, the local craftsmen having once again largely died out. Dal Pozzo also executed a few new mosaics based on preliminary drawings by Giovanni Battista Piazzetta and Sebastiano Ricci. An exclusive contract for restoration was stipulated in 1867 with the mosaic workshop run by the Salviati glassmaking firm, whose highly criticized restoration work often involved removing and resetting the mosaics, usually with a considerable loss of quality. Although the original iconographic programme has been largely preserved, despite centuries of restoration and renewal, and roughly three-fourths of the mosaics maintain their earlier compositions and styles, only about a third can be considered original.

=== Floor mosaics ===
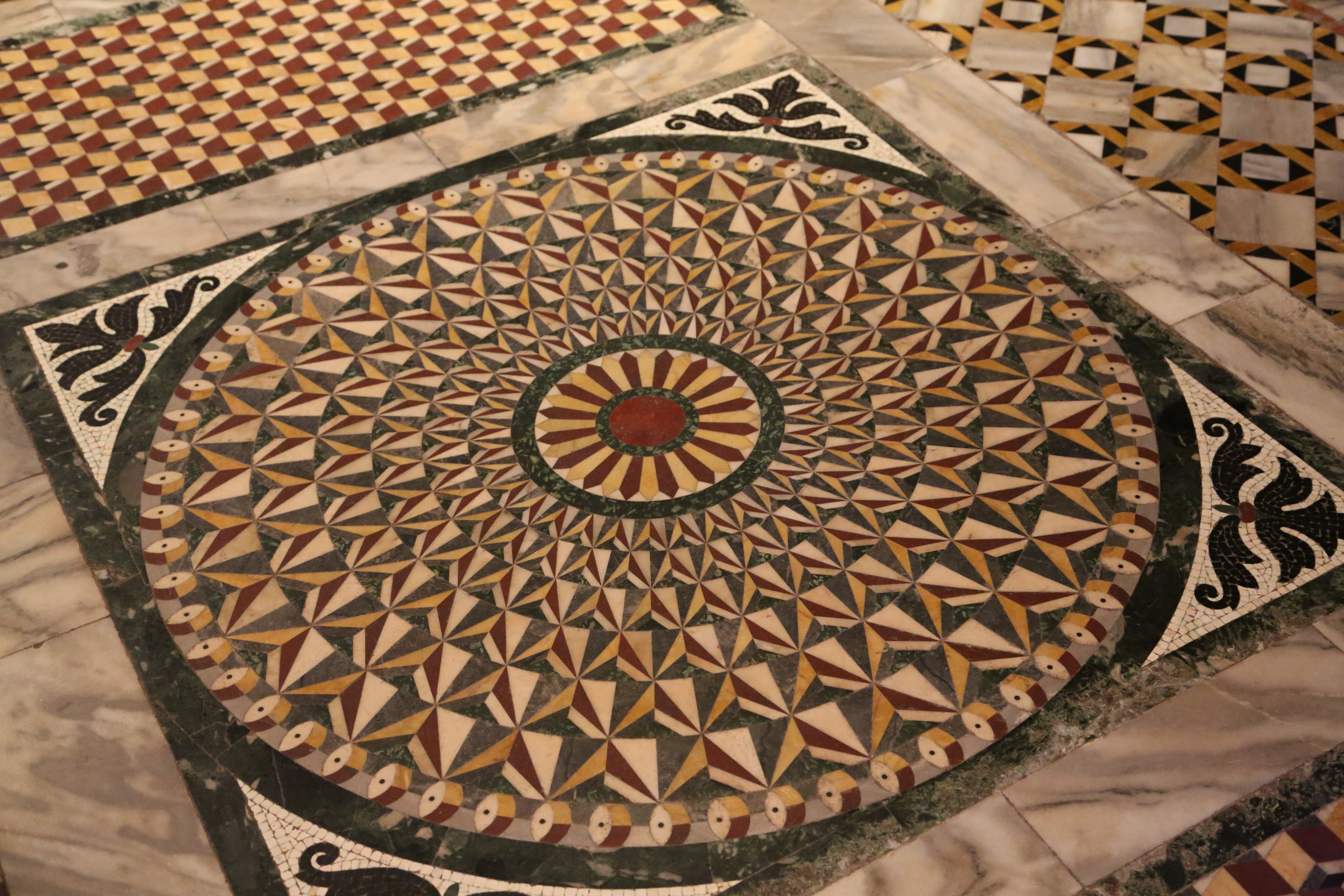
Detail of the floor, executed in opus sectile and opus tessellatum (in the corners)

The floor, executed primarily in opus sectile and to a lesser extent in opus tessellatum, dates to either the late eleventh century or first half of the twelfth century. It consists of geometric patterns and animal designs made from a wide variety of coloured limestones and marbles. The animals represented, including lions, eagles, griffons, deer, dogs, peacocks, and others, largely derive from medieval bestiaries and have symbolic meanings.

Although it has similarities with Romanesque floors, the inclusion of large slabs of marble surrounded with decorative cornices also suggests an influence from eastern prototypes. The frequent use of intertwined circles also recalls medieval Italian cosmatesque floors.

== Administration ==
Under the Venetian Republic, St Mark's was the private chapel of the Doge. The primicerius, responsible for the religious functions, was nominated by the Doge personally, and despite several attempts by the Bishop of Olivolo/Castello (after 1451 Patriarch of Venice) to claim jurisdiction over St Mark's, the primicerius remained subject to the Doge alone.

Beginning in the ninth century, the Doge also nominated a procurator operis ecclesiae Sancti Marci, responsible for the financial administration of the church, its upkeep, and its decoration. By the mid-thirteenth century there were two procurators in charge of the church, denominated de supra (Ecclesiam sancti Marci). Elected by the Great Council, they supervised the church in temporalibus, limiting the authority of the Doge. In 1442, there were three procurators de supra who administered the church and its treasury. The procurators also hired and paid the proto, directly responsible for overseeing construction, maintenance, and restoration.

St Mark's ceased to be the private chapel of the Doge as a result of the fall of the Republic of Venice to the French in 1797, and the primicerius was required to take an oath of office under the provisional municipal government. At that time, plans began to transfer the seat of the Patriarch of Venice from San Pietro di Castello to St Mark's. However, no action was taken before Venice passed under Austrian control in 1798. During the first period of Austrian rule (1798–1805), it was alternatively suggested that the episcopal seat be moved to the Church of San Salvador, but again no action was taken until 1807 when, during the second period of French domination (1805–1814), St Mark's became the patriarchal cathedral. The new status was confirmed by Emperor Francis I of Austria in 1816 during the second period of Austrian rule (1814–1866) and by Pope Pius VII in 1821.

== Music ==
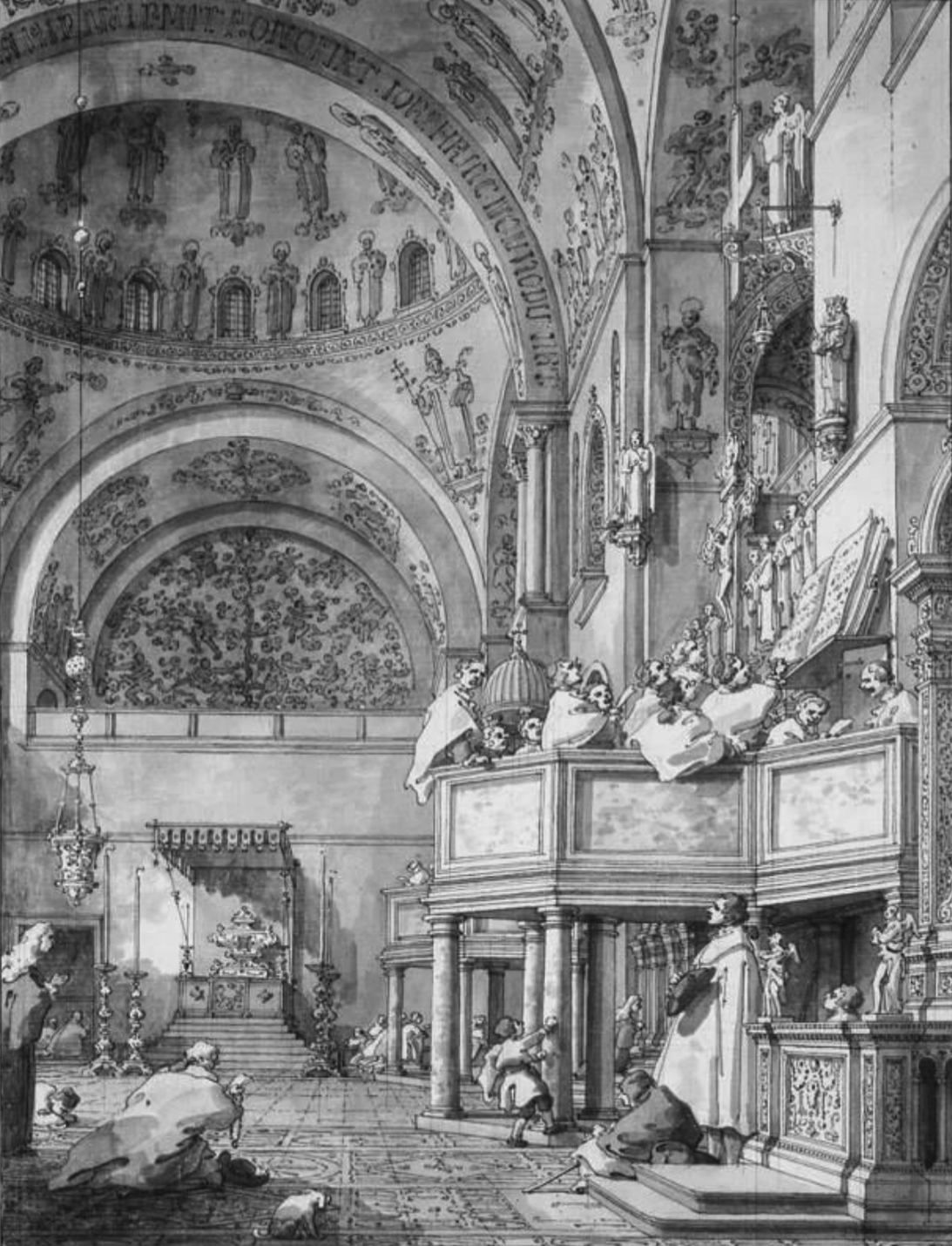
Canaletto, Ceremony of the Easter Mass in San Marco, showing the choir in the pulpitum magnum cantorum

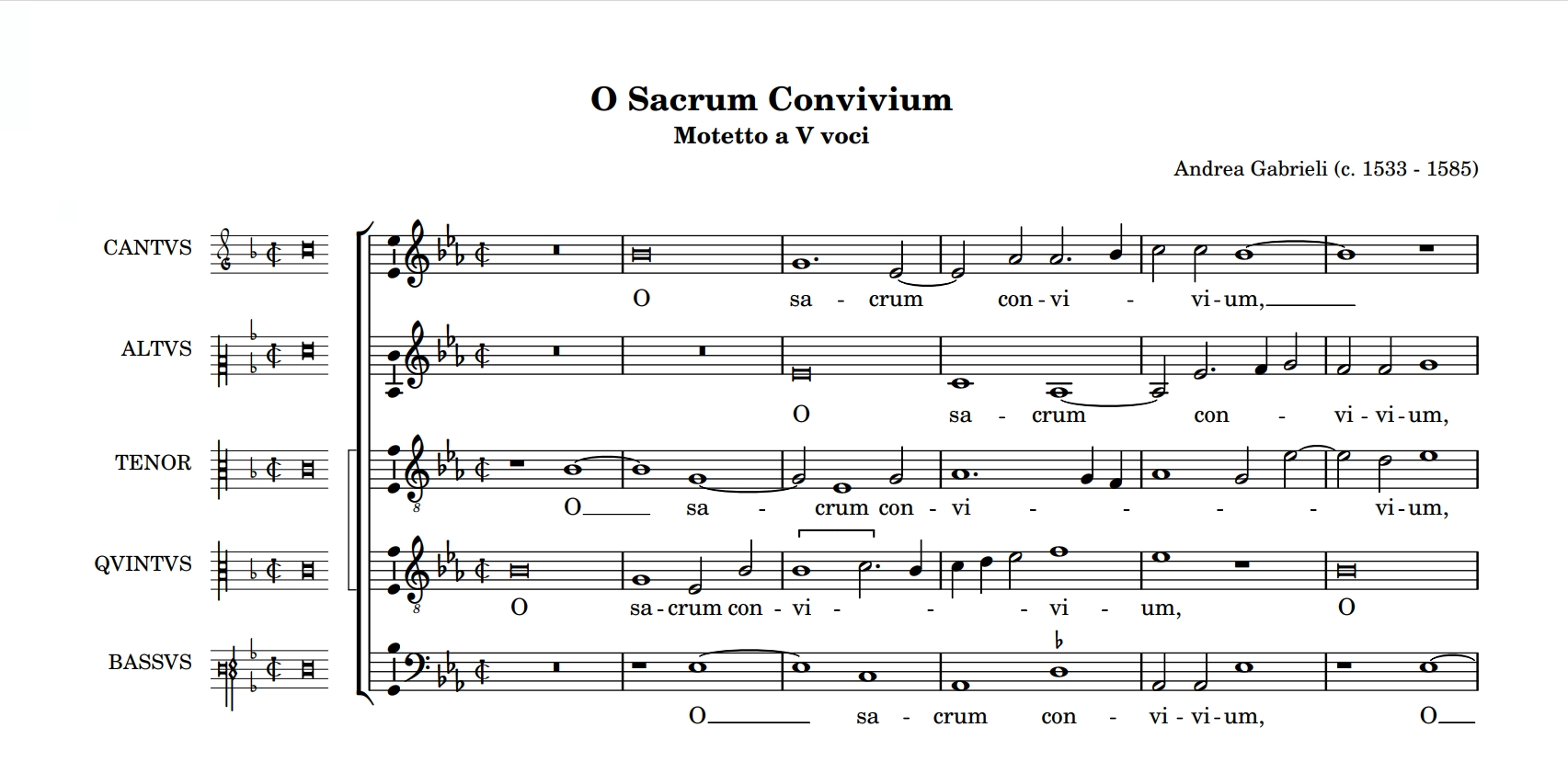
'O Sacrum Convivium, Sanctus & Benedictus' by Andrea Gabrieli on YouTube (Gabrieli Consort)

An expense note for repairs from 1316 indicates that St Mark's already possessed more than one organ, presumably two located in the galleries on either side of the chancel. Over time, they were repeatedly renewed and replaced. Of the organs rebuilt in 1766 by Gaetano Callido, the 'small organ' (organum parvum) in the southern gallery remains, whereas the 'big organ' (organum magnum) in the northern gallery was again rebuilt in 1893, with components from Callido's organ. (Note: Acoustic studies, conducted in 2007, revealed that from the galleries, the sound of the organs is loud and resonant. See Deborah Howard and Laura Moretti, Sound and Space in Renaissance Venice..., p. 30.) A smaller third organ for concerts was located on the floor level after 1588.

Documents also record the use of other instruments for liturgical celebrations, including violins, violas, viole da braccio, violoni, theorbos, cornetts, sackbuts, bassoons, and later flutes, trumpets, and oboes. The number of instruments was fixed at thirty-four in 1685, adjusted to thirty-five in 1786. (Note: The 1685 decree of the procurators, confirmed in 1714, stipulated 8 violins, 11 violas, 2 viole da braccio, 3 violoni, 4 theorbos, 2 cornetts, 1 bassoon, and 3 sackbuts. After 1786, the instruments were 12 violins, 6 violas, 4 violincellos, 5 violoni, 4 oboes and flutes, and 4 horns and trumpets. The cornett could be used to substitute the voice of a soprano or contralto, whereas the sackbut was used in substitution of a bass voice. The bassoon frequently gave the pitch to the choir and was useful for blending harmonies together. See Francesco Fapanni and Gabriele Fantoni, 'The Cappella Musicale', p. 199–201.) Organists, singers, and instrumentalists were selected by the procurators of Saint Mark on the basis of a rigorous examination. (Note: The standard examination for organists, probably from the late sixteenth century, consisted in three tests. The first involved the random extraction of a Kyrie movement or another motet, in polyphony, which the candidate was expected to extemporize with various rhythms and melodies as if for four singers. The second test consisted in the random extraction of plainsong which was to then be played for a bass, a tenor, and a soprano with appropriate fugues. For the third test, the choir sung an uncommon polyphonic piece and the candidate was to improvise the music. See Francesco Fapanni and Gabriele Fantoni, 'The Cappella Musicale', p. 208 and, in general, Arnaldo Morelli, 'Concorsi organistici a san Marco...'.) Many of the early instrumentalists and singers were members of the clergy, but from the mid-seventeenth century, the orphanages attached to the four state hospices supplied the best musicians. Renowned musicians were also invited to perform for special functions.

Beginning in 1491, the procurators also appointed a choirmaster (maestro di cappella) who supervised and conducted all performances. He was assisted by the vice-maestro di cappella and by the maestro di concerti, the directors of the two choirs. The maestro di coro, established in 1514, supervised the plainchant sung by the clergy.

All musicians and singers were obligated to be present whenever the Doge attended mass for solemn occasions. They were positioned in the tribunes on either side of the chancel or in the pulpitum magnum cantorum, the large raised platform in front of the altarscreen on the right. (Note: Acoustic studies in 2007 revealed that from the tribunes, the sound is clear and focused. It reverberates within a relatively enclosed space and is then projected outward. Also, the space between the opposing tribunes is ideal for a split choir, but not so great as to create problems of time lag and intonation. From the raised platform in front of the altarscreen, the sound is projected into the chancel, the altarscreen helping to block later sound reflections from the main part of the church. See Deborah Howard and Laura Moretti, Sound and Space in Renaissance Venice..., p. 39, 41.) For more elaborate compositions with multiple choirs in the seventeenth century, singers and musicians could also be positioned in the upper galleries.

This division of the choir into parts and their physical separation, coro spezzato, was integral to the Venetian polychoral style, the development of which was favoured by the particular acoustic qualities of St Mark's. (Note: As demonstrated by acoustic studies in 2007, the configuration of the church makes it possible for sound to flow through the smaller, interconnected domed spaces, allowing for later reflections from the resonant surface of the marble revetments yet avoiding the excessive reverberation of larger churches. Also the slightly irregular surface of the mosaics diminishes the otherwise disturbing focus of sound under the domes. See Deborah Howard and Laura Moretti, Sound and Space in Renaissance Venice..., pp. 19–20) The style was characterized by two groups, each having a self-sufficient four-part harmony without dissonance, singing alternatively or simultaneously for effect, particularly at the end of a composition. It originated in the early sixteenth century in several cities of the Venetian mainland, including Padua, Bergamo, Treviso, and was introduced into St Mark's by Adrian Willaert who was nominated choirmaster in 1527 at the behest of Doge Andrea Gritti. The style continued to develop and was popularized throughout Europe by means of the compositions of various choirmasters, including Cipriano de Rore, Gioseffo Zarlino, Giovanni Croce, and Claudio Monteverdi, as well as organists such as Claudio Merulo, Andrea Gabrieli, and his nephew Giovanni Gabrieli. Although plainchant and falsobordone continued to be used, psalms sung with coro spezzato were common for vespers and were specifically required for all major holy days.

== See also ==
- Venetian School (music)
- Cappella Marciana
- List of buildings and structures in Venice
- List of churches in Venice
- High medieval domes

Preceded by Santi Giovanni e Paolo	Venice landmarks St Mark's Basilica	Succeeded by Venetian Arsenal
