= Carmagnola (Venice) =

Byzantine sculpture in Venice, Italy

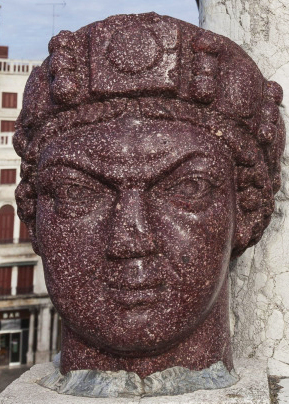
- Year: possibly 6th-century AD
- Medium: porphyry
- Subject: possibly Emperor Justinian I
- Location: St Mark's Basilica, Venice

Carmagnola or la Carmagnola is the traditional name of a porphyry head of a late Roman emperor, now placed on the external balustrade of St Mark's Basilica in Venice. Widely thought to represent Justinian, it was probably brought to Venice as loot from the sack of Constantinople. Its modern name references Francesco Bussone da Carmagnola, whose severed head was displayed nearby in 1432.

== Description ==
The red porphyry head is around 16 inches high and has concave pupils which were once filled with glass paste. The hair and eyes were once painted, but it is not known whether this was part of the original artwork or a later addition. It has been dated on stylistic grounds to between the 4th and 6th centuries and, as per its diadem, portrays a late Roman emperor, with several scholars identifying the subject as Justinian. The flattened nose is probably the result of damage and subsequent repolishing. Richard Delbrück suggests that the shape of the nose is original and that the portrait represents Justinian II, but this is unlikely; Justinian II's nose was cut off in an act of public humiliation, and the disfigurement would not have been commemorated in an honorific statue. The head is "one of the most significant" of the ornamental trophies that adorn the Basilica's facade, looking straight in the direction of Constantinople.

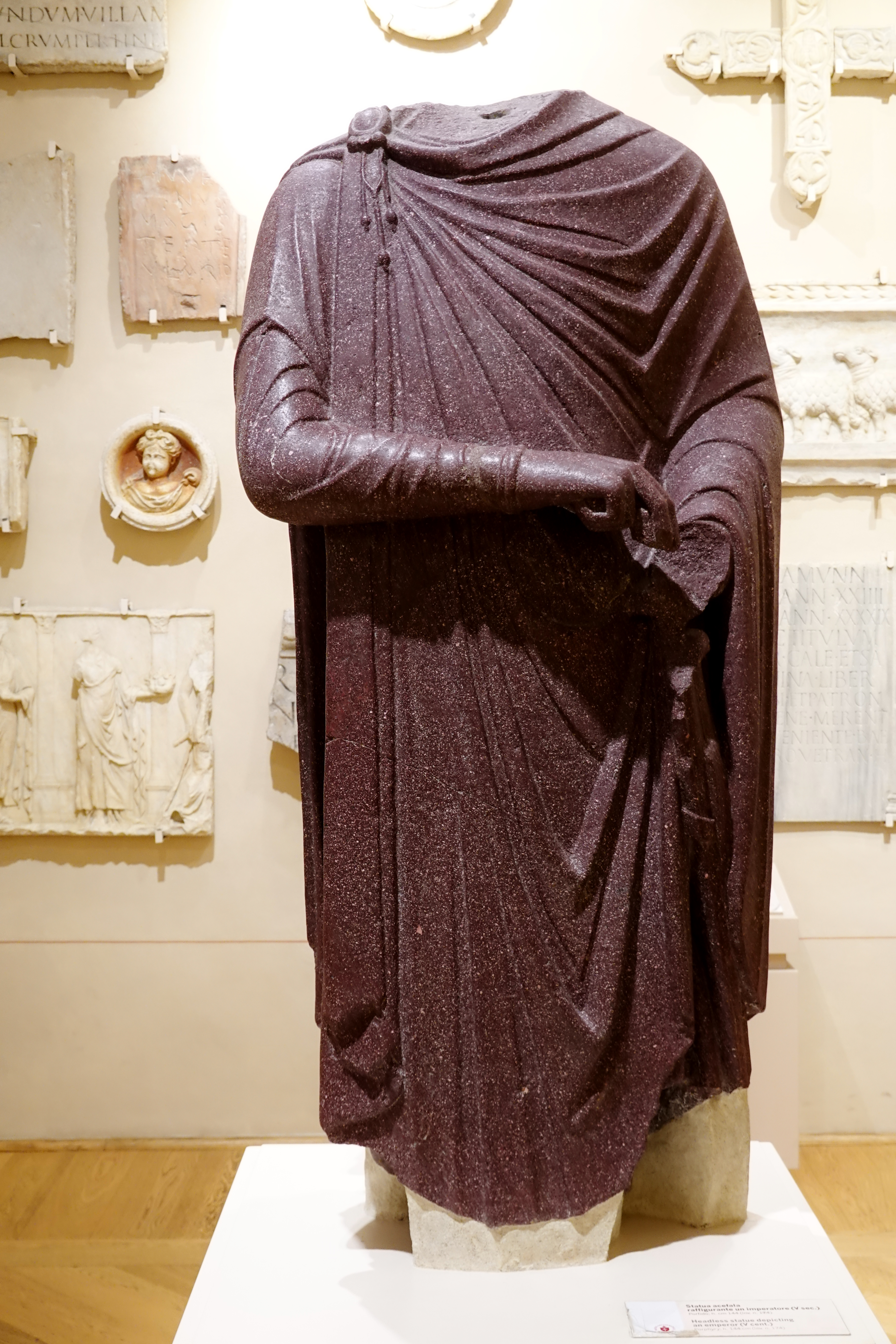
Headless porphyry statue in Ravenna

A headless porphyry statue kept at the Archiepiscopal Museum in Ravenna has been hypothesized to belong to the same original, though some historians believe that the head was not from the same statue.

== History ==
The head was "almost certainly" brought to Venice as part of the loot from the Sack of Constantinople during the Fourth Crusade in 1204 CE. It may have come from the Philadelphion in Constantinople, the original location of the Portrait of the Four Tetrarchs that is now just below on the Basilica's Piazzetta facade. This hypothesis, "suggestive, but not supported by any decisive evidence", is based upon a 1411 account by Manuel Chrysoloras, who describes the Philadelphion as containing the remains of porphyry statues.

The condottiere Francesco Bussone da Carmagnola was beheaded on 5 May 1432 on the Piazzetta, where his head was presumably left exposed for some time, leading to the sculpture's traditional nickname.

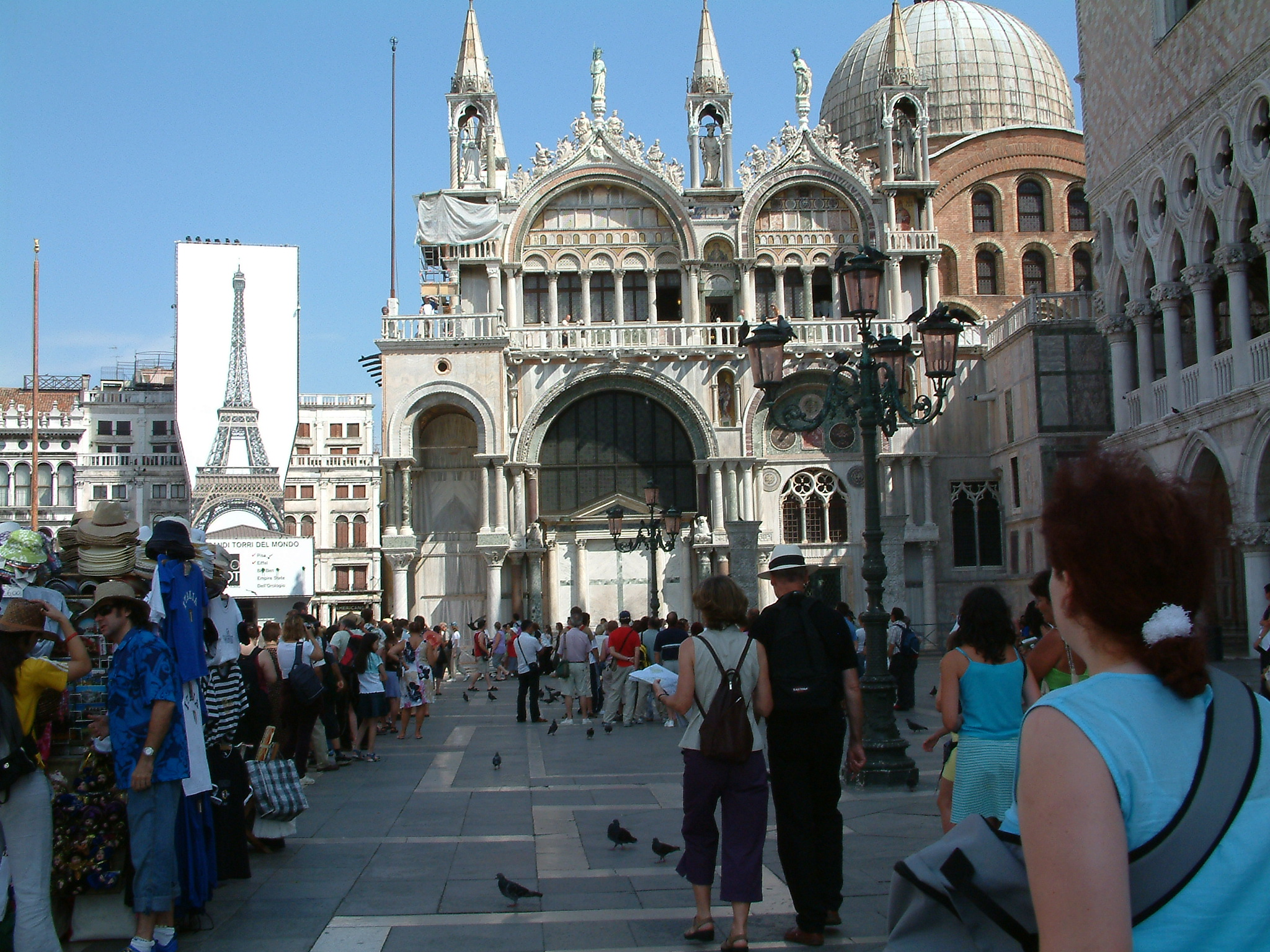
Side facade of St Mark's Basilica, with Carmagnola at the far left of the upper-level railing

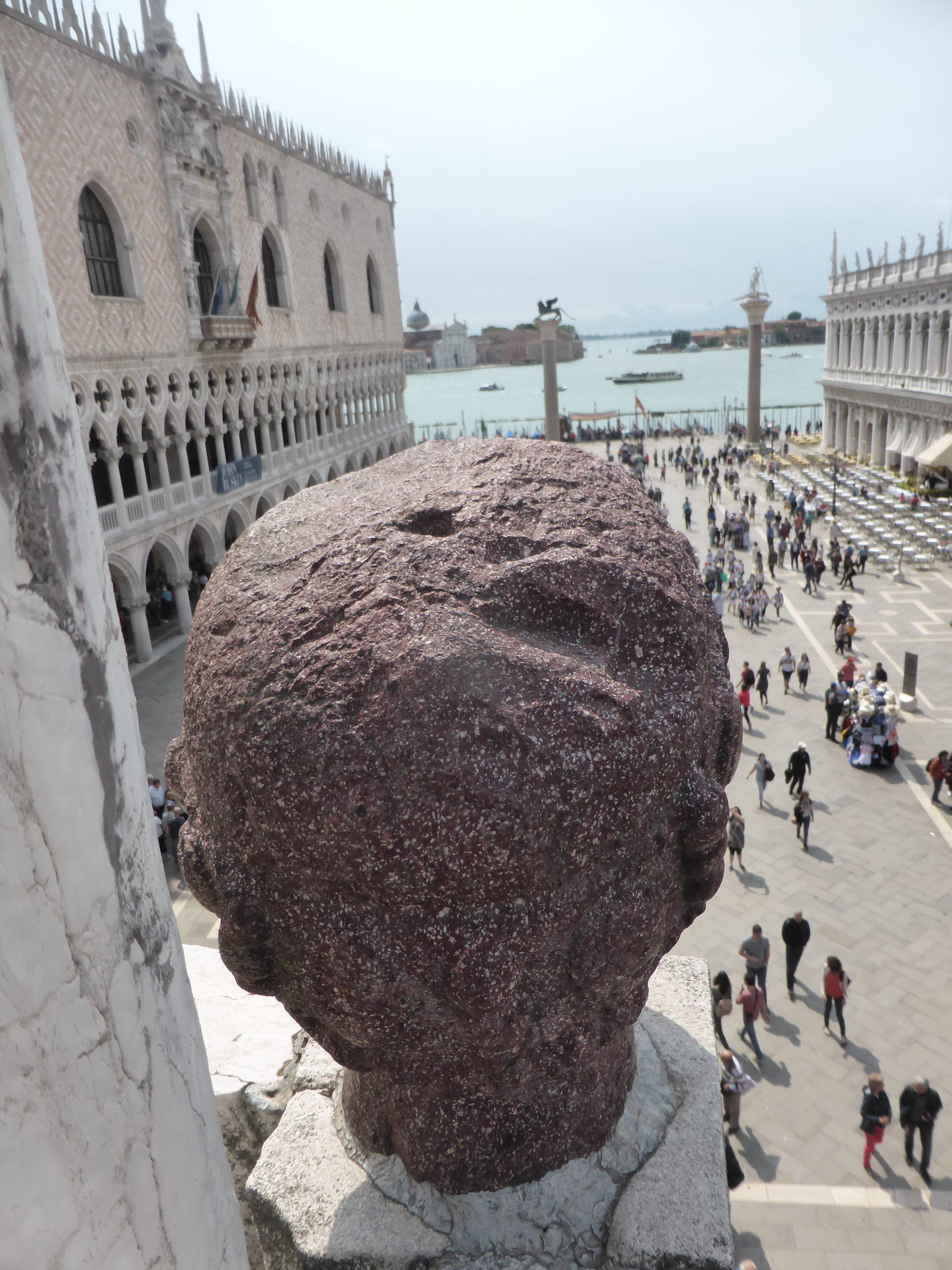
The Piazzetta viewed from behind Carmagnola

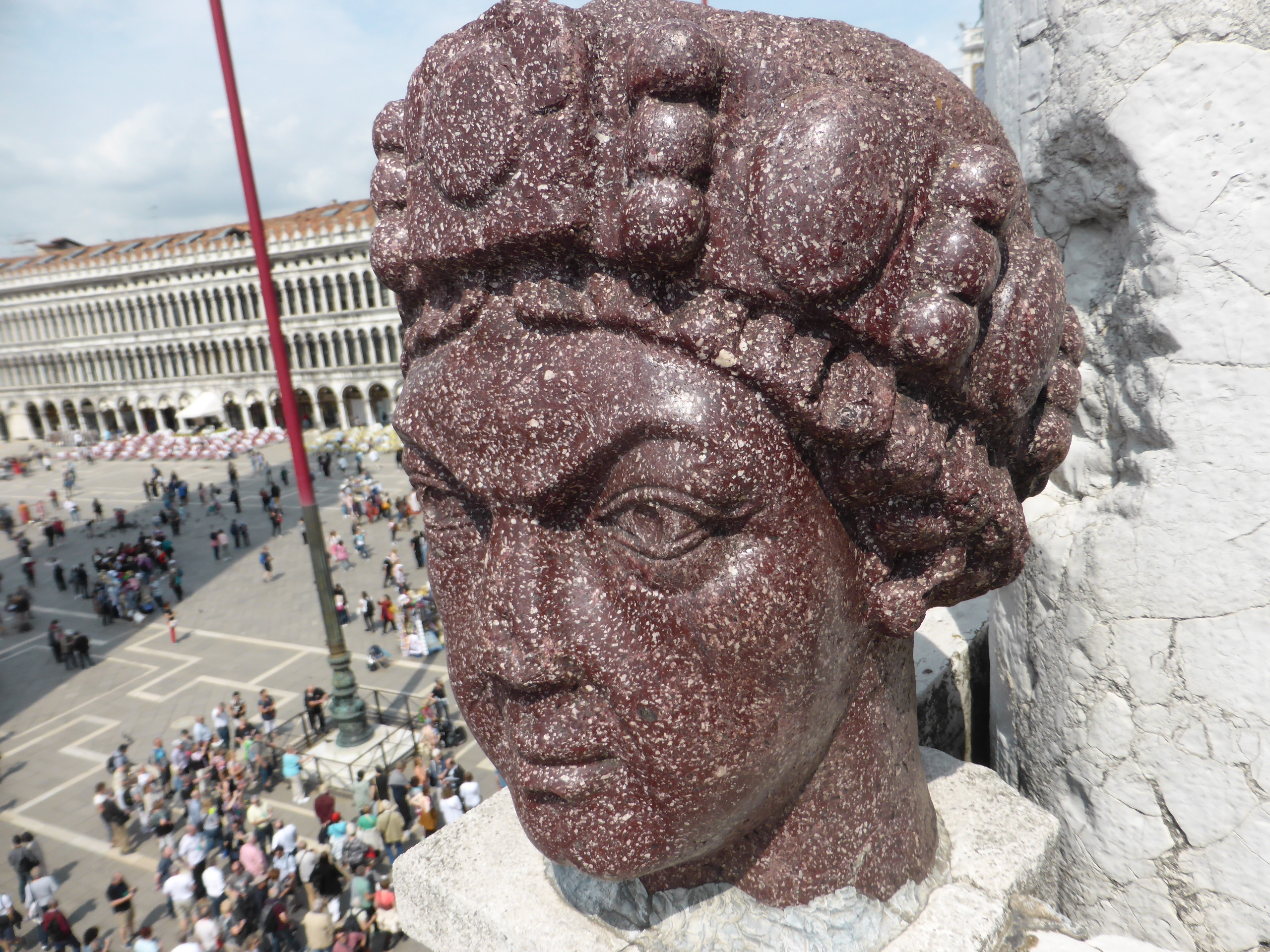
