= Vefa High School =

- Vefa Lisesi
- The official emblem of Vefa High School

Location
- Şehzadebaşı; Vefa; Istanbul, Fatih; Turkey
- Coordinates: 41.014337°N 28.958404°E

Information
- School type: Public boarding
- Established: 1872; 154 years ago
- Language: Turkish, English, German and French
- Classrooms: 28
- Color: Green White
- Website: vefalisesi.k12.tr/en/

Vefa High School (Turkish: Vefa Lisesi, Ottoman Turkish: وفا لیسەسی), is one of the oldest and internationally renowned high schools in Turkey. The first Mülkiye Lisesi (English: Non-military High School) training in Turkish language was Vefa Lisesi established in 1872 which forming and specializing as İdadi lessons and classes in Mekteb-i Mülkiye. Vefa S.K. was formed in this institution with initial players all being members of the school. It is located in Vefa at Fatih, Istanbul.

== History ==
Prior to the late 18th century, traditional educational institutions such as mahalle mektebi (English: neighborhood school) and medrese dominated in the Ottoman Empire. The modernization of education began with the establishment of military academic institutions, marking the start of formal modern education. Throughout the 19th century, a dual system emerged where both traditional and modern educational institutions coexisted. Various modern educational models were introduced, including primary schools (Turkish: sıbyan mektepleri), secondary schools (Turkish: rüşdiye), high schools (Turkish: idadi), and imperial colleges (Turkish: sultani).

Significant milestones in the evolution of modern education included the establishment of the first military high school, Kuleli Military High School, in 1845, the first teacher training school, Darülmuallimin in 1848, and the first imperial college, Galatasaray High School, in 1868. Independent academic schools such as Mülkiye Mektebi, Hukuk Mektebi (currently the Istanbul University Law School), and Tıbbiye Mektebi were also founded during this period.

In 1868, the organization of modern educational institutions was formalized by the Maarif-i Umumiye Nizamnamesi, drafted under Ahmet Cevdet Pasha, the Minister of Education. This regulation established a structured educational system comprising three levels: primary, secondary and academy. The primary education institutions were mahalle and sıbyan mektepleri, while the secondary level included rüşdiye, İdadi, and sultani schools, with idadi serving as the precursor to contemporary high schools. The first non-military high school offering instruction in Turkish was Vefa Lisesi, established in 1872, which specialized in idadi courses.

The history of what is now known as Vefa Erkek Lisesi (English: Vefa High School for Boys) involves a series of significant transformations and relocations reflecting the evolution of education in Turkey. Initially, in 1886, all classes of İdadi sections from the academic faculties (Mekteb-i Mülkiye, Mekteb-i Tıbbiye, Mekteb-i Hukuk) were consolidated into an independent high school, named Dersaadet İdadi-i Mülk-i Şahanesi.

The school was relocated in 1884 to a building in the Vefa district, bought by the Ministry of Education from Gazi Ahmet Muhtar Pasha and previously built by Sadrazam Mütercim Rüştü Pasha, now known as Orta Bina. In 1900, reflecting its new location, the school was renamed Vefa İdadi-i Mülki-i Şahanesi and later upgraded to a sultani, becoming Vefa Mekteb-i Sultanisi in the 1913-1914 academic year.

Following the Tevhid-i Tedrisat Kanunu in 1924, which standardized the Turkish education system under the Republic, the school, along with all idadis and sultanis, was renamed Vefa Erkek Lisesi. It briefly served as a secondary school, Vefa Orta Mektebi, while housed in the Pharmacy School building in Kadırga. In 1933, thanks to efforts led by alumni including Kemalettin Gedeleç, the school moved back to its historical building in Vefa and was reinstated as Vefa Erkek Lisesi, serving both secondary and high school students until 1990, when it was transformed into an Anatolian High School.

The first evening high school in Istanbul was established in 1958 at Vefa High School. Known as Vefa Evening High School, it operated successfully until 1978, during which time it graduated nearly 5,000 students. The school was then transferred to Pertevniyal High School. The alumni of Vefa Evening High School include several notable figures such as ministers, deputies, craftsmen, businessmen, and scientists, illustrating the significant impact and broad reach of the school's educational offerings.

== Campus ==
Vefa Anatolian High School provides training-education on an area in the district of Eminönü, quarter Şehzadebaşı, consisting of 4481 square metres. On 2000 square metres of this area, the school buildings are located, and 2500 square metres are garden. The school buildings consist of one boarding-house, the two other being training-educational buildings.

=== Main building ===
In the new building of school, which is called the Main Building, the following are located:

- the directorate of the school,
- the administrative units,
- 18 classrooms,
- 3 scientific laboratories (physics, chemistry, biology),
- 2 computer laboratories,
- 1 measuring-evaluating center,
- guiding service (counselling commission),
- art workshop,
- school museum,
- archive,
- conference hall (has a capacity of 400 people),
- 2 teachers' rooms,
- room for school's family union,
- room for social activities committee,
- the school canteen and tea cafe (Osman Amca's Place).

=== Middle building ===
In the Mütercim Rüştü Paşa Mansion of the school, which is called the Middle Building, there are:

- 8 classrooms,
- musical teaching room,
- cine-vision hall (has a capacity of 70 people),
- library (has a capacity of 50 people),
- 1 room for vice-director,
- guiding service (counselling commission),
- a room for The Head of Foreign Languages Department,
- the course center.

=== Boarding-house ===
In the boarding-house, there is a refectory in the basement floor for 250 people, in the 1st floor there are warehouses, in the 2nd and 3rd floors 10 dormitories, 1 television room and rooms for other teaching personal. The boarding-house has a capacity of 90 students.

== Extra-curricular activities ==
=== Publications ===
- Yeşil-Beyaz
- Gazete-Vefa
- Vefanzin

=== Clubs ===
- Basketball
- Chess
- Choir
- Theater
- Volleyball
