= Portrait of the Four Tetrarchs =

Sculpture outside the St Mark's Basilica in Venice, Italy

Coordinates: 45°26′03″N 12°20′23″E

Portraits of the Four Tetrarchs
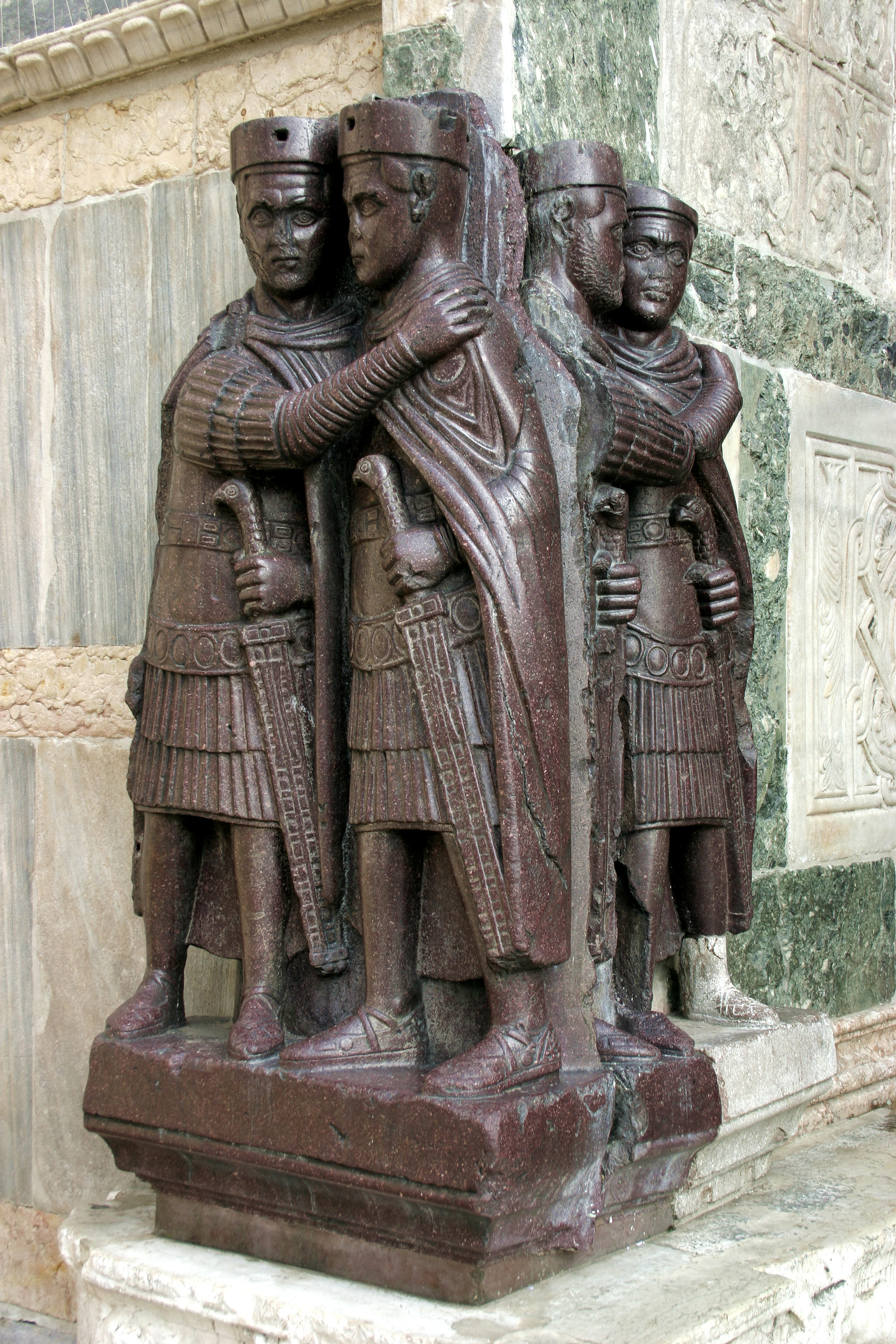
- Portraits of the Four Tetrarchs, porphyry, c. 305 A.D., embedded in the façade of St. Mark's Basilica, Venice
- Type: Sculptural group; architectural sculpture
- Material: Porphyry
- Height: 4 feet 3 inches (1.30 m)
- Symbols: Imperial unity; military power; tetrarchic authority
- Created: c. 305 AD, Constantinople
- Discovered: Philadelphion, Constantinople (probable original location)
- Present location: St. Mark's Basilica, Venice, Italy
- Classification: Ancient Roman sculpture; Late Roman art
- Culture: Roman Empire

The Portrait of the Four Tetrarchs is a porphyry sculpture group of four Roman emperors dating from around 300 AD. The sculptural group has been fixed to a corner of the façade of St Mark's Basilica in Venice, Italy since the Middle Ages. It probably formed part of the decorations of the Philadelphion in Constantinople, and was removed to Venice in 1204 or soon after.

Spolia from the Fourth Crusade, the statues were originally designed as two separate sculptures, each consisting of a pair of armoured late Roman emperors embracing one another. The paired statues stand on plinths supported by a console of the same stone, and their backs are engaged in the remains of large porphyry columns to which the statues were once attached, carved all of a piece. The columns no longer exist, and one emperor pair is missing part of the plinth and an emperor's foot, which has been found in Istanbul. One statue pair has been sliced vertically and is missing a large portion of the right-hand emperor's right side, while another vertical slice divides the two figures and has sawn through their embracing arms.

The Portrait of the Four Tetrarchs probably depicts the four rulers of the Empire instituted by Emperor Diocletian – the first Tetrarchy. He appointed as co-augustus Maximian; they chose Galerius and Constantius I as their caesares; Constantius was father to Constantine the Great. There is disagreement as to the identity of these statues and their placement, but it is suggested that the Eastern rulers form a pair and the Western rulers form the other pair, each pair consisting of the senior augustus and the junior caesar. Another possibility is that the two augusti are depicted in one pair and the two caesares in the other. A third, older theory is that they represent a dynastic group of the Constantinian dynasty.

== History ==
External videos
- The Four Tetrarchs at Smarthistory.

For a time in the late third and early fourth centuries, the Roman Empire was ruled by a tetrarchy consisting of two augusti (senior emperors) and two Caesars (junior emperors). The empire was divided into western and eastern territories, with one Augustus and Caesar ruling over each. After Diocletian and his colleague, Maximian, retired in 305, internal strife erupted among the tetrarchs. The system finally ceased to exist around 313, and though this form of government was short-lived, it served to separate military and civic leadership roles and was one of the first examples of balanced power in Rome since the collapse of the Roman Republic in the first century BCE.

The Portrait of the Four Tetrarchs symbolizes the concept of the tetrarchy, rather than providing four personal portraits. Each tetrarch looks the same, without any individualized characteristics, except that two, probably representing the older augusti, have beards, and two do not who might have symbolized the caesars. The group is divided into pairs, each embracing, which unites augusti and caesars together. The overall effect suggests unity and stability. The very choice of material, the durable porphyry (which came from Egypt), symbolizes a permanence and rigidity reminiscent of Egyptian statuary. Porphyry was rare and expensive, hard to obtain in sculptural quantities, and therefore limited to imperial honorands in statuary.

Their function would have been similar to many other representations of rulers in other cities. Chiefly, this purpose was to reinforce the strength and power the Tetrarchs held over the Empire, power that could reward the faithful and quash the rebellious. This latter theme seems to be reflected by the fact that all four tetrarchs are armed, wearing military garb, an unmistakable representation of collective power. Having such an image in a prominent public place would have caused these themes to be on the minds of the public as they went about their daily business.

=== Constantinople ===
The tetrarchy gave way to a united Roman Empire in the time of Constantine, as the emperor took control over the east and west halves in 324. When Constantine refounded Byzantium as "New Rome" – Constantinople – in 328–330, he relocated numerous historically or artistically significant monuments and sculptures to the city. Where the porphyry tetrarchs on their columns were originally set up is unknown, but they were probably transported from there to Constantinople. The columns and statues probably decorated the portico of Constantinople's Capitolium of which opened onto a public area on the Mese, to which the statues' embrace of fraternal love (Ancient Greek: φιλαδέλφεια, romanized: Philadélpheia) apparently gave the name "Philadelphion".

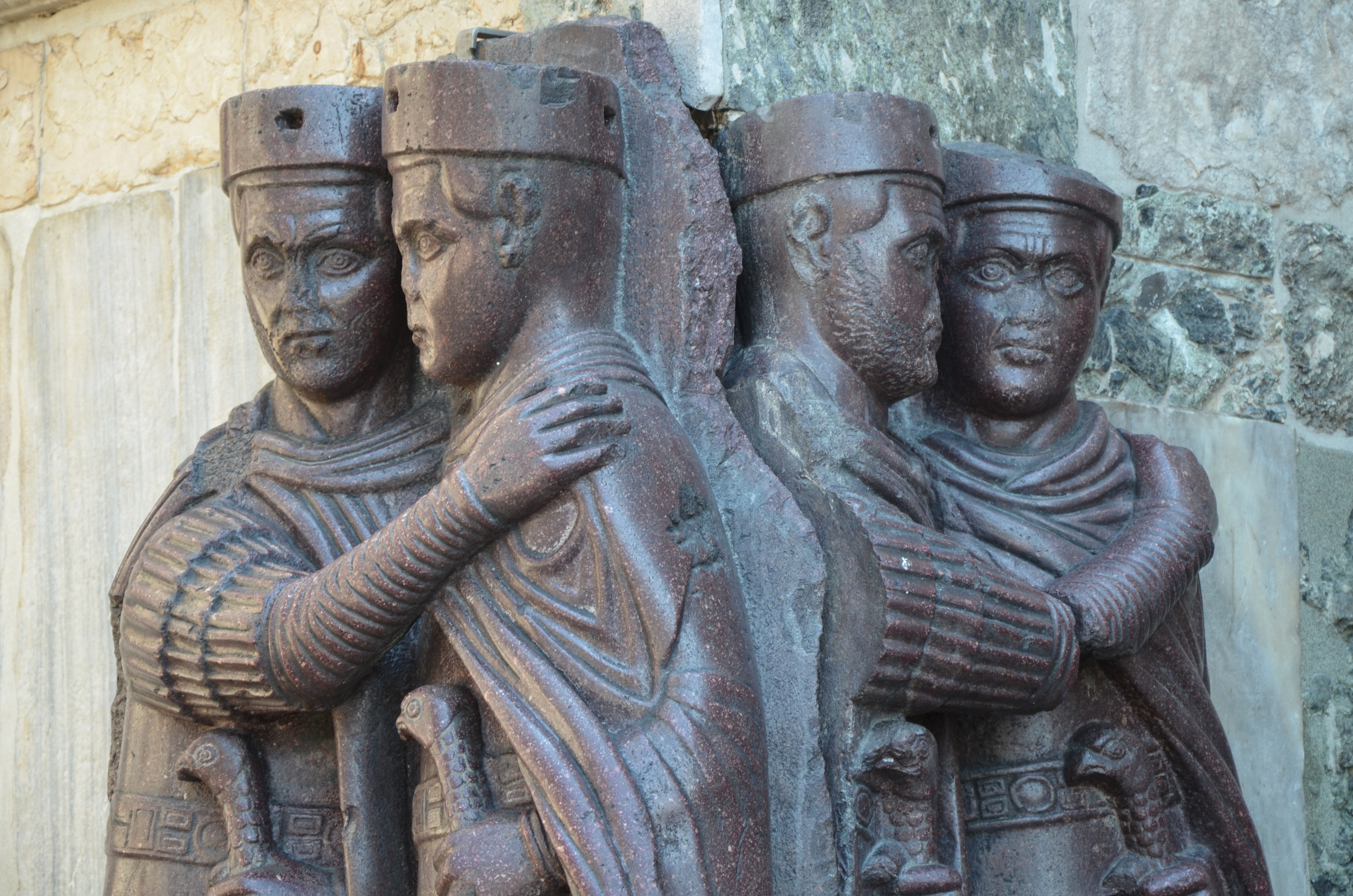
Portrait of the Four Tetrarchs (head and torso detail-group of four)

=== Venice ===
The Four Tetrarchs were plundered by the Venetians when the city was sacked during the Fourth Crusade in 1204 and brought to St. Mark's Basilica in Venice. In the 1960s, the heel part of the missing foot was discovered by archaeologists in Istanbul close to the Bodrum Mosque. This part is in the Istanbul Archaeology Museum.

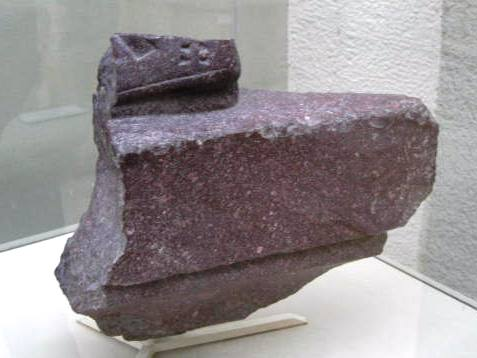
Missing heel portion kept in the Istanbul Archaeology Museum

== Style ==
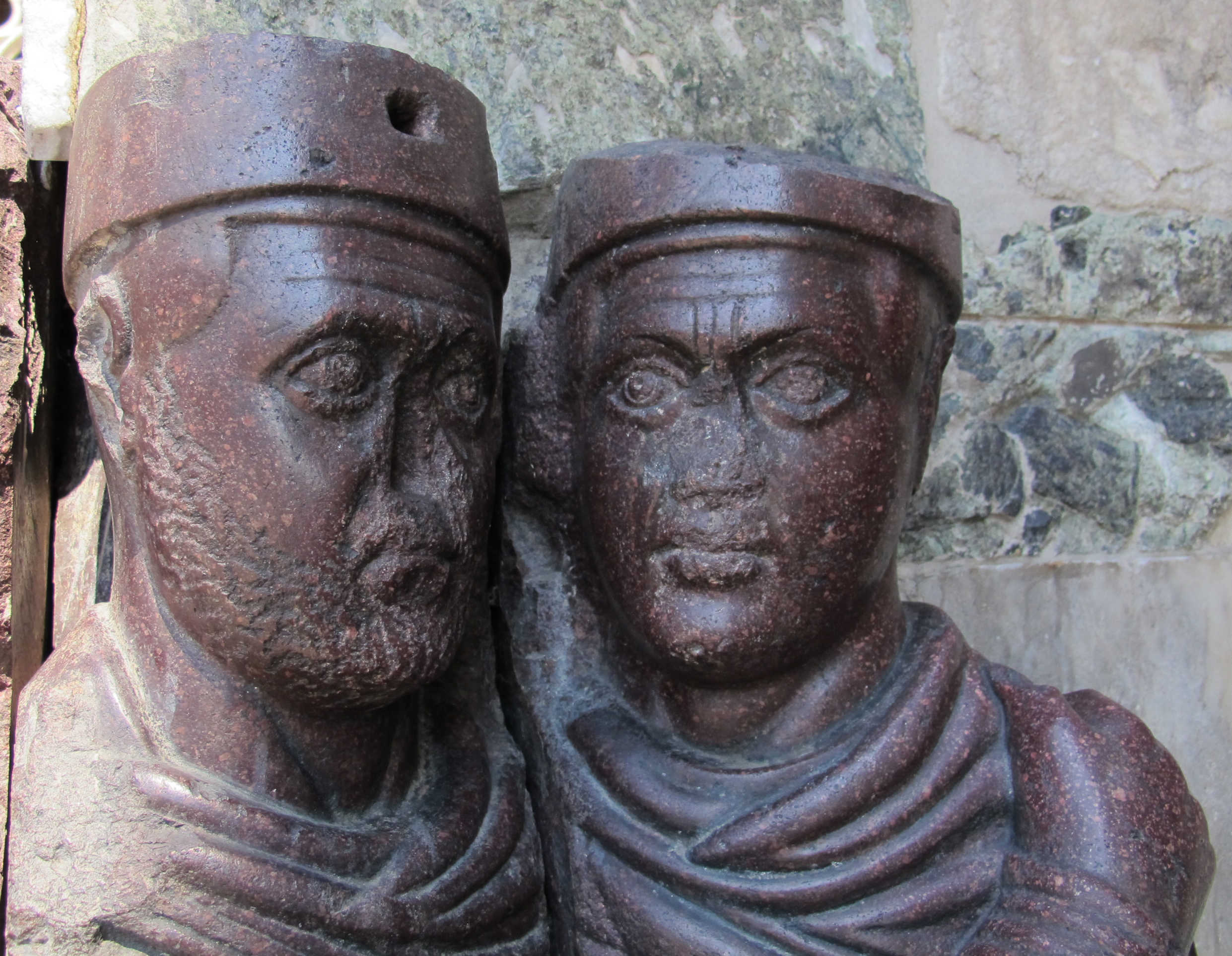
Detail

The figures are stout and blocky, far from the verisimilitude or the idealism of earlier Graeco-Roman art. The figures are stiff and rigid, the attire being patterned and stylized. Their faces are repetitive and they seem to stare in a kind of trance. Comparing them to the slightly later reliefs on the Arch of Constantine in Rome, Ernst Kitzinger finds the same "stubby proportions, angular movements, an ordering of parts through symmetry and repetition and a rendering of features and drapery folds through incisions rather than modelling". Noting other examples, he continues "The hallmark of the style wherever it appears consists of an emphatic hardness, heaviness and angularity — in short, an almost complete rejection of the classical tradition". On the contrary, another theory considers the classical style sublimated in a formal stream that manages to unite three different cultural elements: Greek-Roman, Barbarian-Celtic and Persian-Sasanian, which would make the monument not only a symbol of timelessness and profound mysticism of power, but also a visual and cultural glue between East and West, in a framework of ideal solidification of the universal empire of Rome.

The question of how to account for what may seem a decline in both style and execution in Late Antique art has generated a vast amount of discussion. Factors introduced into the discussion include: a breakdown of the transmission in artistic skills due to the political and economic disruption of the Crisis of the Third Century, influence from Eastern and other pre-classical regional styles from around the Empire (a view promoted by Josef Strzygowski (1862–1941), and now mostly discounted), the emergence into high-status public art of a simpler "popular" or "Italic" style that had been used by the less wealthy throughout the reign of Greek models, an active ideological turning against what classical styles had come to represent, and a deliberate preference for seeing the world simply and exploiting the expressive possibilities that a simpler style gave. One factor that cannot be responsible, as the date and origin of the Portrait of the Four Tetrarchs show, is the rise of Christianity to official support, as the changes predated that. This shift in artistic style points towards the style of the Middle Ages.

== Material ==
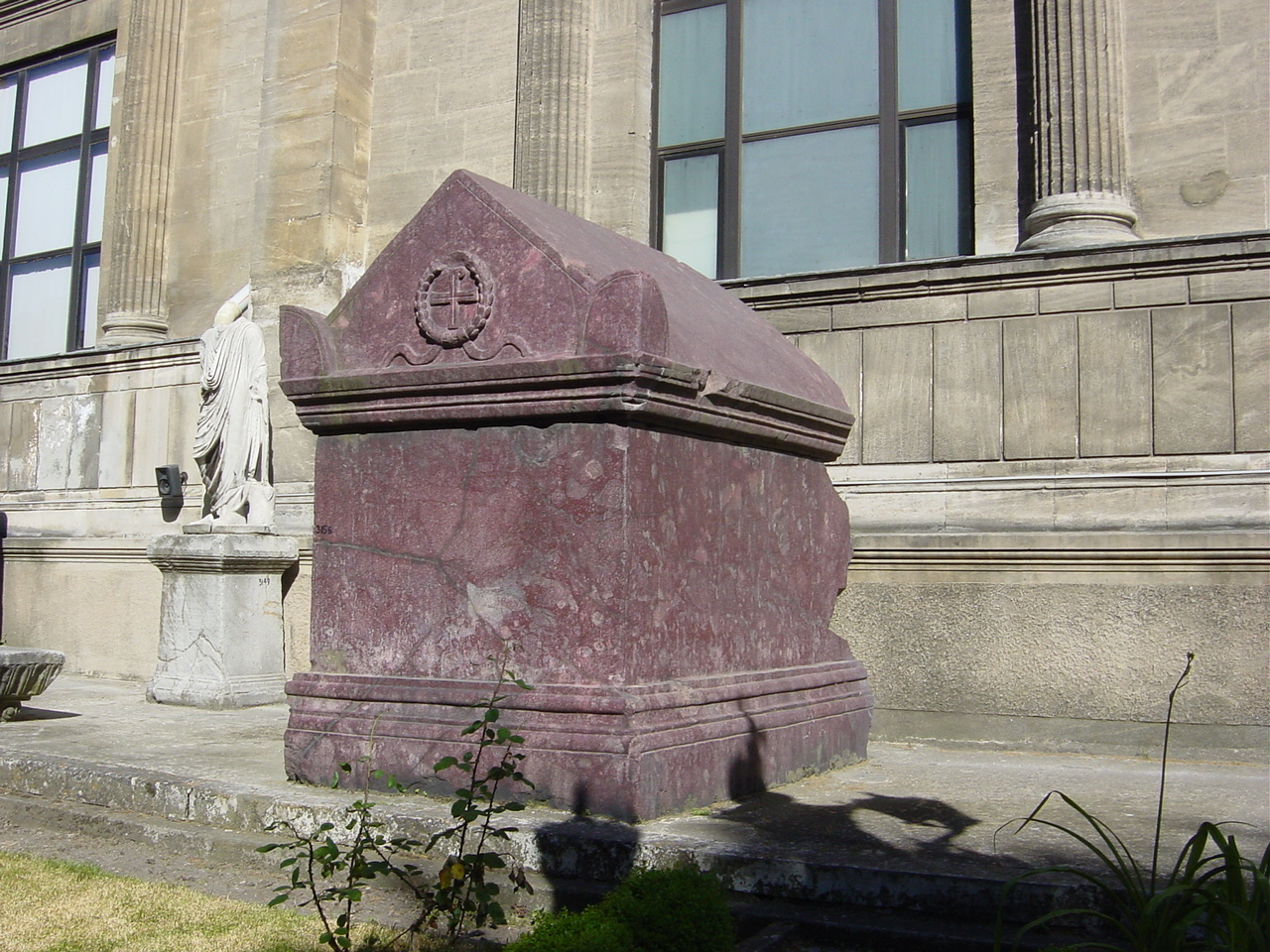
Porphyry sarcophagus, Istanbul Archaeological Museum

Porphyry as a material choice was a bold and specific statement for late Imperial Rome. As well as the expense, the comparatively vivid colour of porphyry compared to other stones showed that these figures were many levels above, even approaching the status of gods, and worthy of great respect. Porphyry made the emperors unapproachable in terms of power and nature, belonging to another world, the world of the mighty gods, present for a short time on earth.

Porphyry also stood in for the physical purple robes Roman emperors would wear to show their status because of its purple colouring. Similar to porphyry, purple fabric was extremely difficult to make, as purple required the use of snails to make the dye. The colour itself would have caused the public to remember how they were to behave in the presence of the real emperors wearing the real fabric, with respect bordering on worship for their self-proclaimed god-kings.

== Aesthetic context ==
Similarly to Greek rulers, Roman leaders borrowed recognizable features from the appearances of their predecessors. For instance, rulers coming after Alexander the Great copied his distinct hairstyle and intense gaze in their own portraits. This was commonly practised to suggest their likeness to them in character and their legitimacy to rule; in short, these fictitious additions were meant to persuade their subjects that they would be as great and powerful a leader as the previous ruler had been. This period marked a sharp departure from the veristic depictions of Republican Rome, which was reflected visually through stylistic contrasts. Though this shift may at first seem like a regression, it marked the development of a style where symbolism trumped realism and idealism alike.

== See also ==
- Carmagnola, a porphyry head on the balustrade, also from Constantinople
