= Porphyry (geology) =

Textural form of igneous rock with large grained crystals in a fine matrix

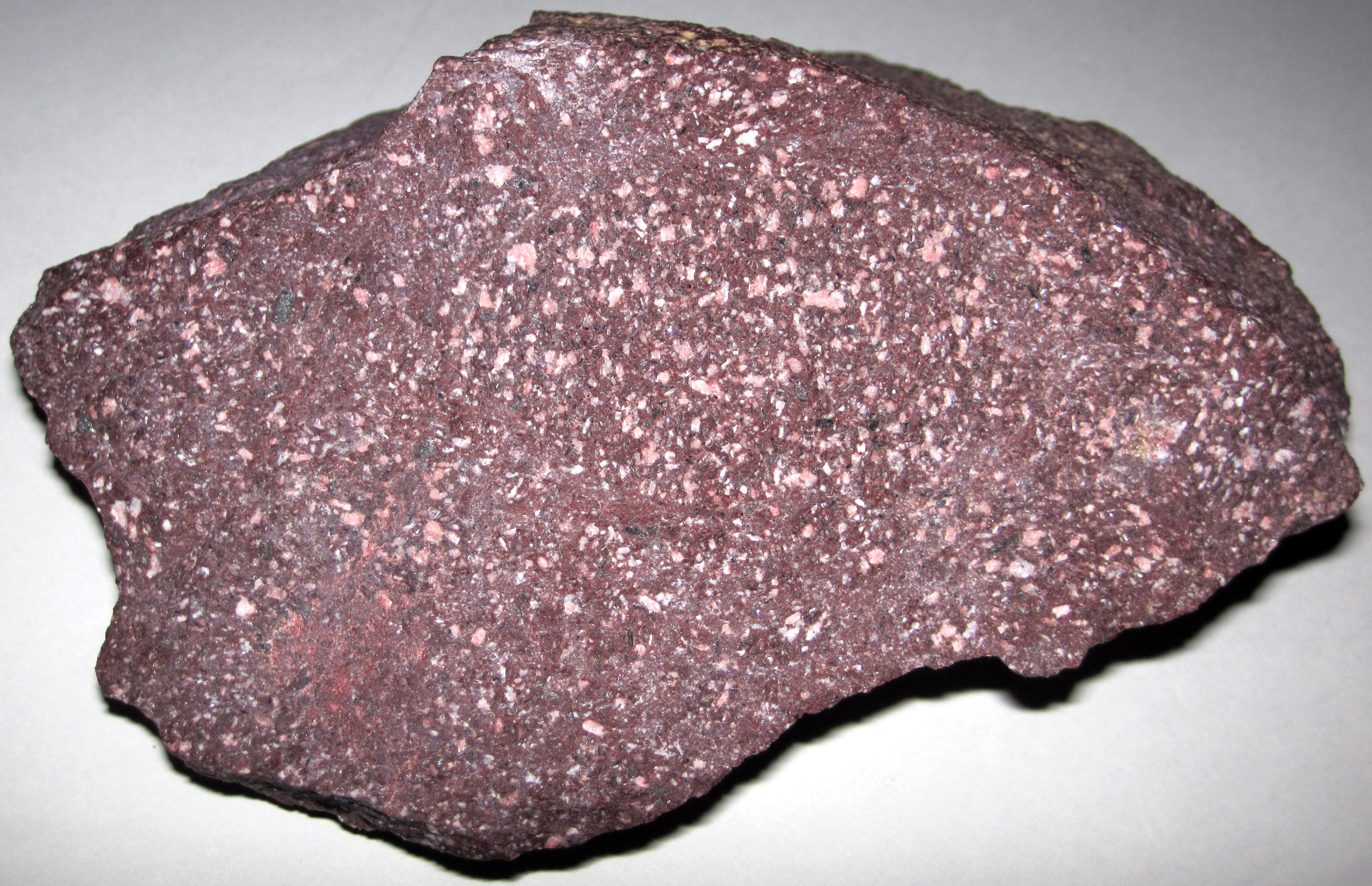
"Imperial Porphyry" from the Red Sea Mountains of Egypt

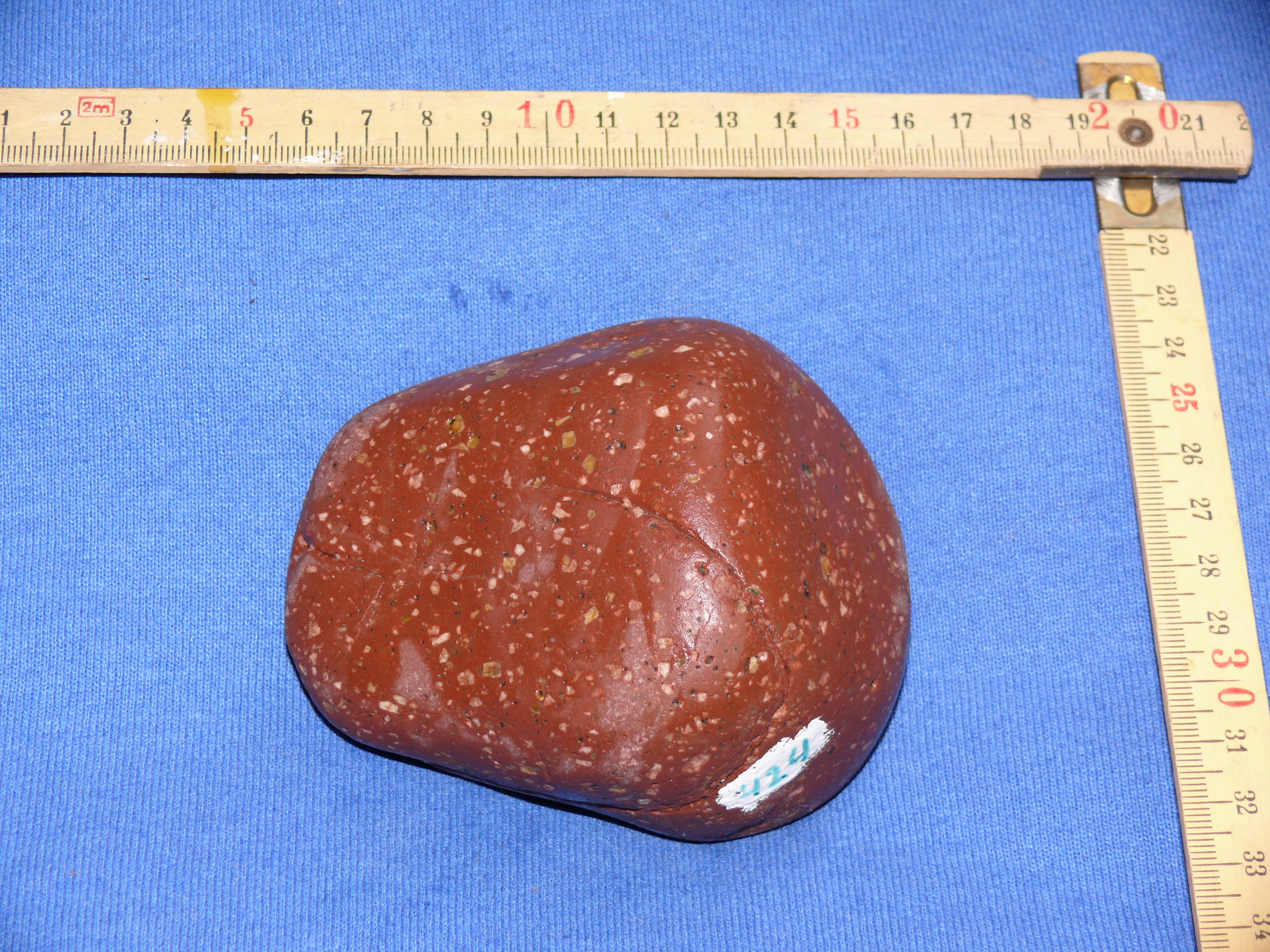
A waterworn cobble of porphyry

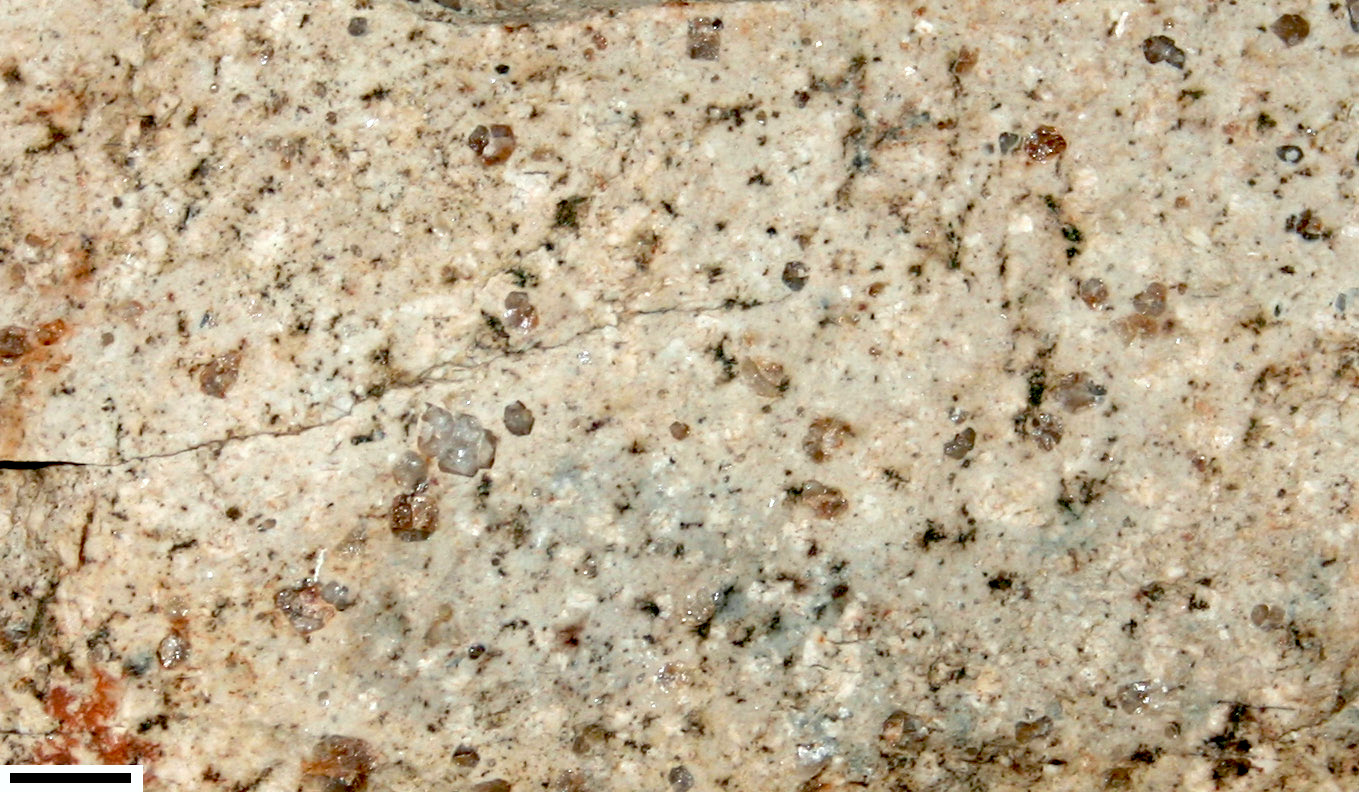
Rhyolite porphyry from Colorado; scale bar in lower left is 1 cm (0.39 in)

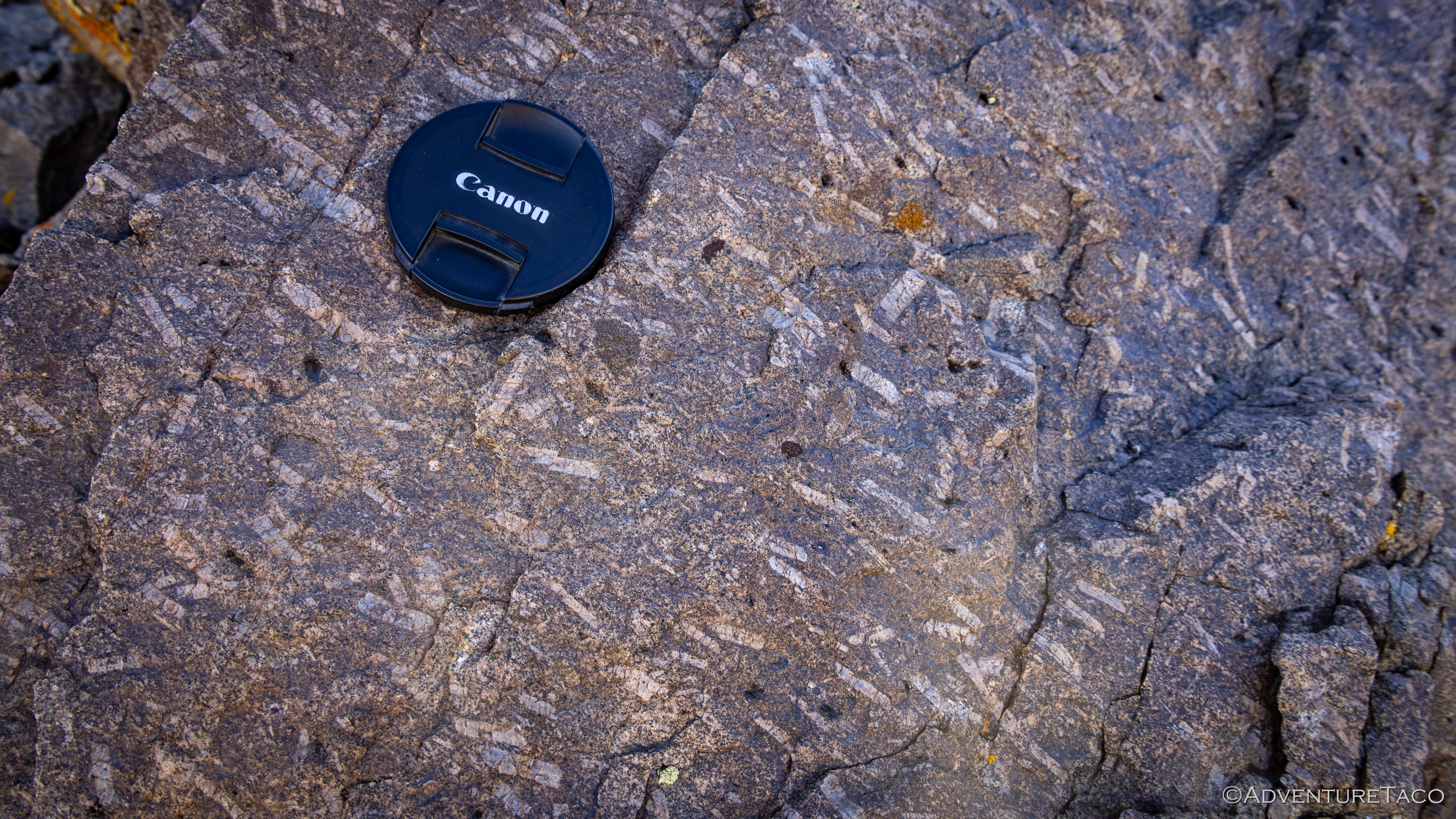
Igneous porphyry from the Hunter Mountain pluton in the Last Chance Range in Death Valley National Park

Porphyry (/ˈpɔːrfəri/ POR-fə-ree) is any of various granites or igneous rocks with coarse-grained crystals such as feldspar or quartz dispersed in a fine-grained silicate-rich, generally aphanitic matrix or groundmass. In its non-geologic, traditional use, the term porphyry usually refers to the purple-red form of this stone, valued for its appearance, but other colours of decorative porphyry are also used such as "green", "black" and "grey".

The term porphyry is from the Ancient Greek πορφύρα (porphyra), meaning "purple". Purple was the colour of royalty, and the Roman "imperial porphyry" was a deep purple igneous rock with large crystals of plagioclase. Some authors claimed the rock was the hardest known in antiquity. Thus porphyry was prized for monuments and building projects in Imperial Rome and thereafter.

Subsequently, the name was given to any igneous rocks with large crystals. The adjective porphyritic now refers to a certain texture of igneous rock regardless of its chemical and mineralogical composition or its color. Its chief characteristic is a large difference in size between the tiny matrix crystals and the much larger phenocrysts. Porphyries may be aphanites or phanerites, that is, the groundmass may have microscopic crystals as in basalt, or crystals easily distinguishable with the eye, as in granite.

== Formation ==
Most igneous rocks have some degree of porphyritic texture. This is because most magma from which igneous rock solidifies is produced by partial melting of a mixture of different minerals. At first the mixed melt slowly cools deep in the crust. The magma begins crystallizing, the highest melting point minerals closest to the overall composition first, in a process called fractional crystallization. This forms phenocrysts, which usually have plenty of room for growth, and form large, well-shaped crystals with characteristic crystal faces (euhedral crystals). If they are different in density to the remaining melt, these phenocrysts usually settle out of solution, eventually creating cumulates; however if the partially crystallized magma is then erupted to the surface as a lava, the remainder of the melt is quickly cooled around the phenocrysts and crystallizes much more rapidly to form a very fine-grained or glassy matrix.

Porphyry can also form even from magma that completely solidifies while still underground. The groundmass will be visibly crystalline, though not as large as the phenocrysts. The crystallization of the phenocrysts during fractional crystallization changes the composition of the remaining liquid magma, moving it closer to the eutectic point, with a mixed composition of minerals. As the temperature continues to decrease, this point is reached, and the rock is entirely solidified. The simultaneous crystallization of the remaining minerals produces the finer-grained matrix surrounding the phenocrysts, as they crowd each other out.

The significance of porphyritic texture as an indication that magma forms through different stages of cooling was first recognized by the Canadian geologist, Norman L. Bowen, in 1928.

Porphyritic texture is particularly common in andesite, with the most prominent phenocrysts typically composed of plagioclase feldspar. Plagioclase has almost the same density as basaltic magma, so plagioclase phenocrysts are likely to remain suspended in the magma rather than settling out.

=== Rhomb porphyry ===
Rhomb porphyry is a volcanic rock with gray-white large porphyritic rhombus-shaped phenocrysts of feldspar (commonly anorthoclase) embedded in a very fine-grained red-brown matrix. The composition of rhomb porphyry places it in the trachyte–latite classification of the QAPF diagram.

Rhomb porphyry is found in continental rift areas, including the East African Rift (including Mount Kilimanjaro), Mount Erebus near the Ross Sea in Antarctica, the Oslo graben in Norway, and south-central British Columbia.

== Use in art and architecture ==
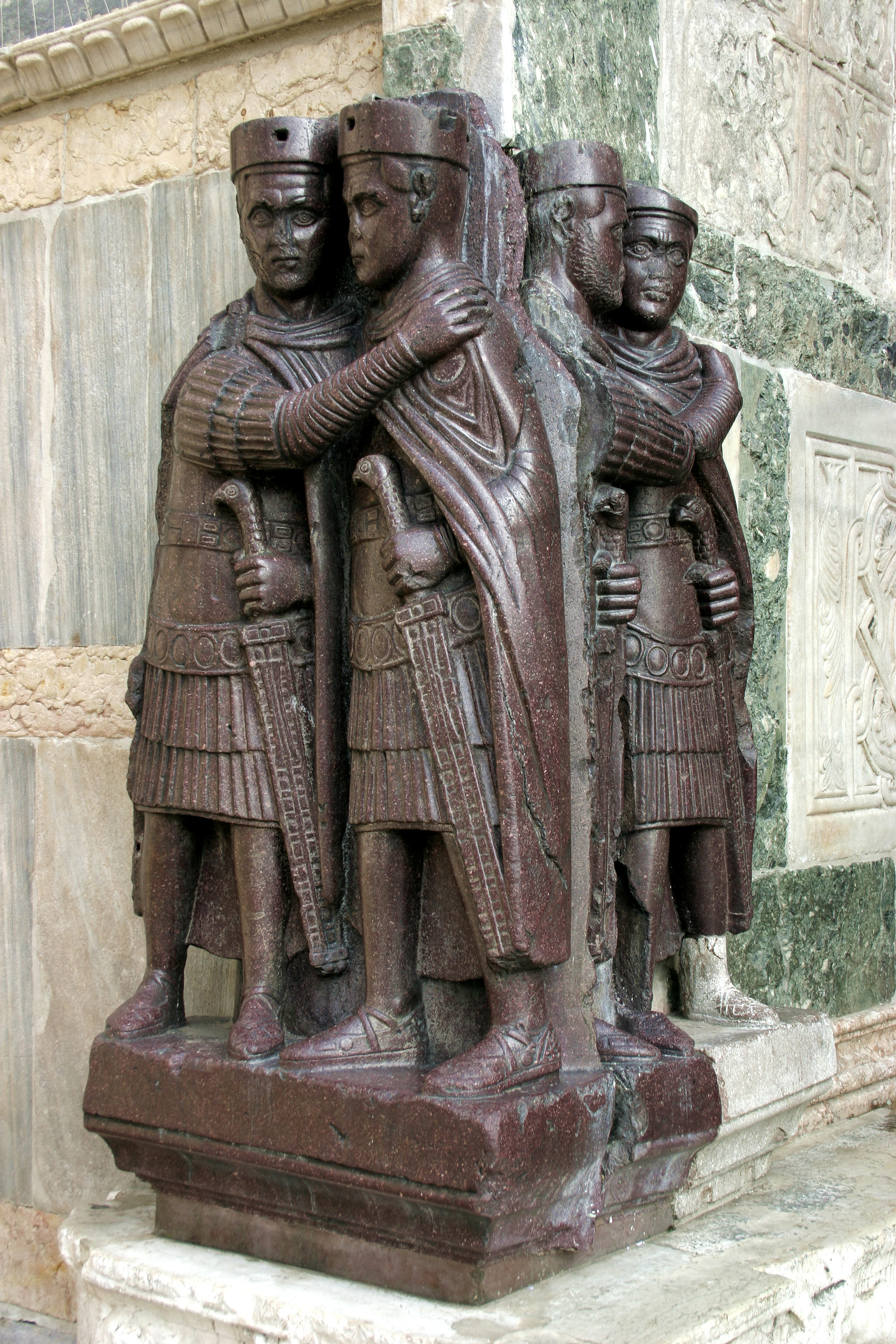
The Tetrarchs, a porphyry sculpture sacked from the Byzantine Philadelphion palace in 1204, Treasury of St. Marks, Venice

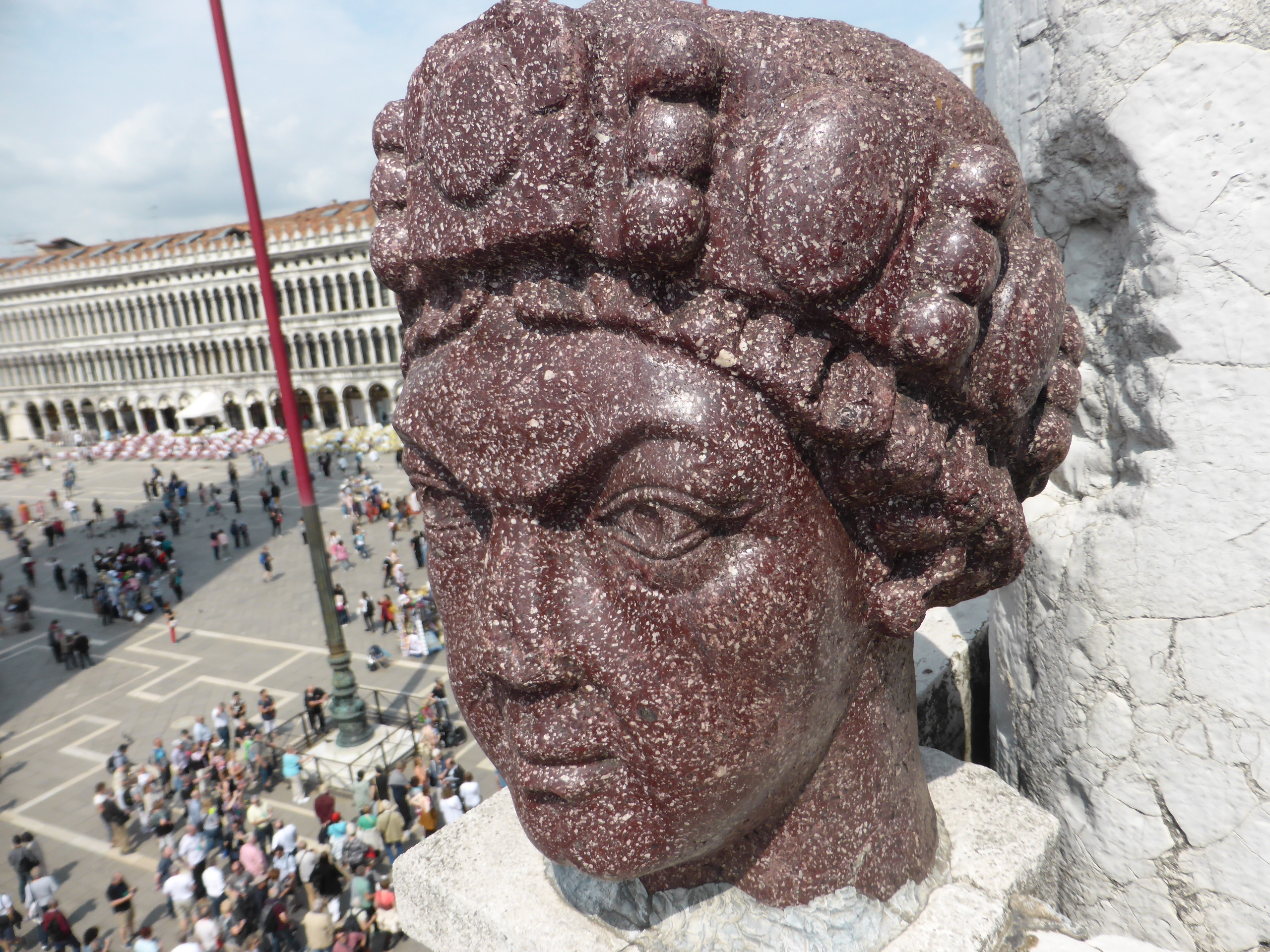
Carmagnola, an imperial porphyry head in Venice thought to represent Justinian

=== Antiquity and Byzantium ===
To the Romans it was known as Lapis porphyrites. Pliny the Elder's Natural History (36, 11) affirmed that the "Imperial Porphyry" had been discovered in Egypt during the reign of Tiberius; an inscription recently discovered and dated from AD 18 mentions the Roman Caius Cominius Leugas as the finder of this new quarry. Ancient Egyptians used other decorative porphyritic stones of a very close composition and appearance, but apparently remained unaware of the presence of the Roman grade although it was located in their own country, because its colour had no official value like that of Romans. It was also sometimes used in Minoan art, and as early as 1850 BC on Crete in Minoan Knossos there were large column bases made of porphyry.

It was called "Imperial" as the mines, as elsewhere in the empire, were owned by the emperor. The red porphyry all came from the Gabal Abu Dukhan quarry (or Mons Porphyrites) in the Eastern Desert of Egypt, from 600 million-year-old andesite of the Arabian-Nubian Shield. The road from the quarry westward to Qena (Roman Maximianopolis) on the Nile, which Ptolemy put on his second-century map, was first described by Strabo, and it is to this day known as the Via Porphyrites, the Porphyry Road, its track marked by the hydreumata, or watering wells that made it viable in this utterly dry landscape. It was used for all the red porphyry columns in Rome, the togas on busts of emperors, the panels in the revetment of the Pantheon, the Column of Constantine in Istanbul as well as the altars and vases and fountain basins reused in the Renaissance and dispersed as far as Kyiv.

The Romans also used "Green Porphyry" (lapis Lacedaemonius, from Greece, also known today as Serpentine), and "Black Porphyry" from the same Egyptian quarry.

After the fifth century the quarry was lost to sight for many centuries. Byzantium scholar Alexander Vasiliev suggested this was the consequence of the Council of Chalcedon in 451 and the subsequent troubles in Egypt. The scientific members of the French Expedition under Napoleon sought it in vain, and it was only when the Eastern Desert was reopened for study under Muhammad Ali that the site was rediscovered by the English Egyptologists James Burton and John Gardner Wilkinson in 1823.

Porphyry was extensively used in Byzantine imperial monuments, for example in Hagia Sophia and in the "Porphyra", the official delivery room for use of pregnant Empresses in the Great Palace of Constantinople, giving rise to the phrase "born in the purple".

In general, the renowned rarity and striking appearance of porphyry in the late Roman Empire meant that its use was limited to explicitly Imperial monuments and architecture, thereby helping to emphasize the power and authority of the Emperor in the eyes of the citizens. Porphyry also stood in for the physical purple robes Roman emperors wore to show status, because of its purple colouring. Similar to porphyry, purple fabric was extremely difficult to make, as what we now call Tyrian purple required the use of rare sea snails to make the dye. The colour itself reminded the public how to behave in the presence of the emperors, with respect bordering on worship for the self-proclaimed god-kings.

=== Roman and late Roman imperial sarcophagi ===
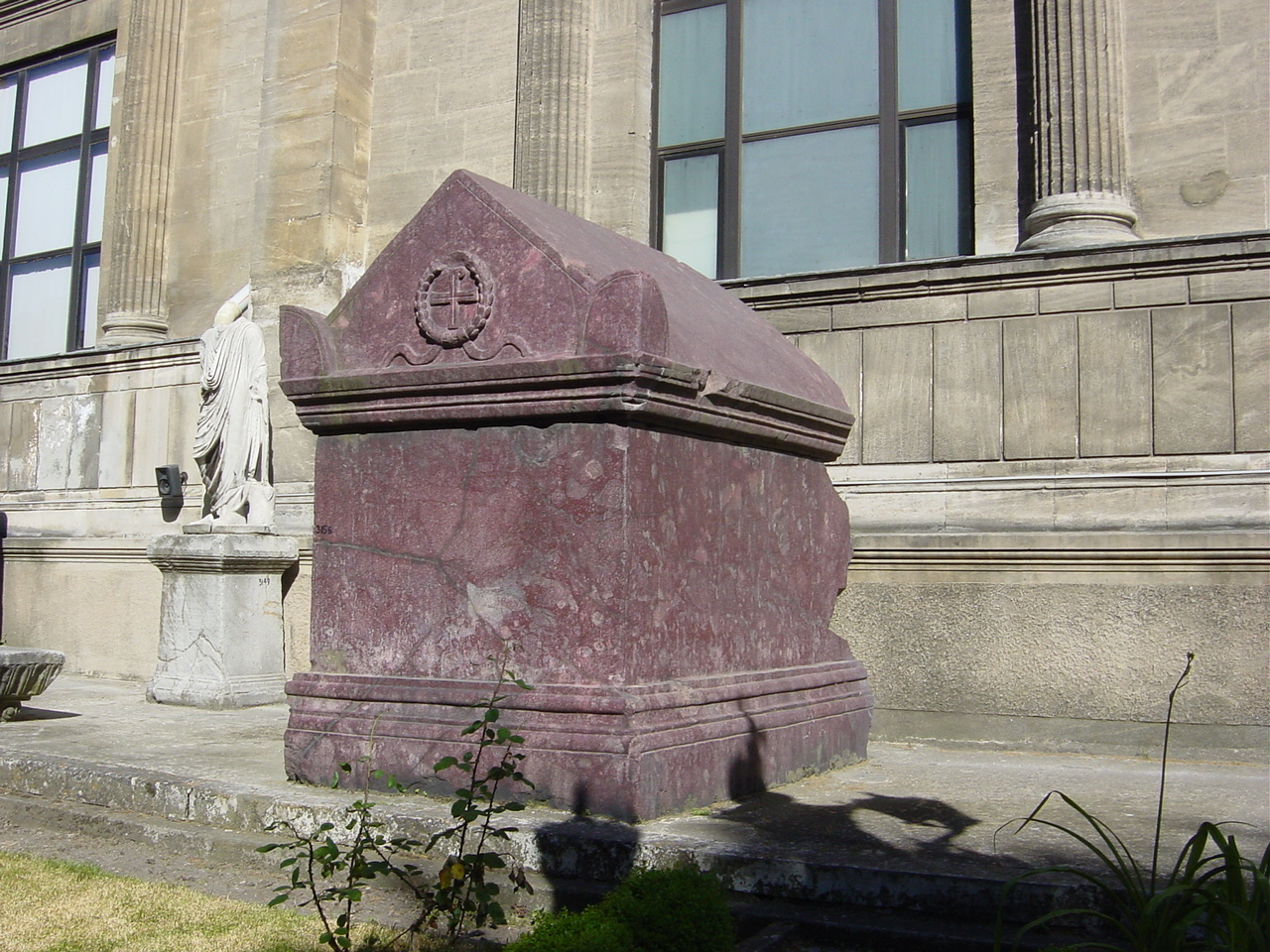
Porphyry sarcophagus, Istanbul Archaeological Museum

A uniquely prestigious use of porphyry was its choice as material for imperial sarcophagi in the 4th and early 5th centuries. That tradition appears to have been started with Diocletian's porphyry sarcophagus in his mausoleum, which was destroyed when the building was repurposed as a church but of which probable fragments are at the Archaeological Museum in Split, Croatia. The oldest and best-preserved ones are now conserved at the Vatican Museums and known as the Sarcophagi of Helena and Constantina.

Nine other imperial porphyry sarcophagi were long held in the Church of the Holy Apostles in Constantinople. They were described by Constantine VII Porphyrogenitus in the De Ceremoniis (mid-10th century), who specified them to be respectively of Constantine the Great, Constantius II, Julian, Jovian, Theodosius I, Arcadius, Aelia Eudoxia, Theodosius II, and Marcian. Of these, most still exist in complete or fragmentary form, despite depredations by later Byzantine Emperors, Crusaders, and Ottoman conquerors. Four presently adorn the facade of the main building of the İstanbul Archaeology Museums, including one whose rounded shape led Alexander Vasiliev to suggest attribution to Emperor Julian on the basis of Constantine Porphyrogenitus's description. Vasiliev conjectures that the nine imperial sarcophagi, including one which carries a crux ansata or Egyptian cross, were carved in Egypt before shipment to Constantinople.

=== Porphyry sarcophagi in post-Roman Western Europe ===
The imperial porphyry sarcophagi tradition was emulated by Ostrogothic King Theodoric the Great (454-526), whose mausoleum in Ravenna still contains a porphyry tub that was used as his sarcophagus. Similarly Charles the Bald, King of West Francia and Holy Roman Emperor, was buried at Saint-Denis in a porphyry tub which may be the same one known as "Dagobert's tub" (cuve de Dagobert), now in the Louvre.

The tomb of Peter III of Aragon, in the Monastery of Santes Creus near Tarragona, reuses a porphyry tub or alveus, which has been conjectured to be originally the sarcophagus of Late Roman Emperor Constans in his mausoleum at Centcelles, a nearby site with a well-preserved 4th-century rotunda.

In twelfth- and thirteenth-century Sicily, another group of porphyry sarcophagi were produced from the reign of Roger II onward and used for Royal and then Imperial burials, namely those of King Roger II, King William I, Emperor Henry VI, Empress Constance, and Emperor Frederick II. They are all now in the Palermo Cathedral, except William's in Monreale Cathedral. Scholar Rosa Bacile argues that they were carved by a local workshop from porphyry imported from Rome, the latter four plausibly (based on observation of their fluting) all from a single column shaft that may have been taken from the Baths of Caracalla or the Baths of Diocletian. She notes that these Sicilian porphyry sarcophagi "are the very first examples of medieval free-standing secular tombs in the West, and therefore play a unique role within the history of Italian sepulchral art (earlier and later tombs are adjacent to, and dependent on walls)."

Six grand porphyry sarcophagi are featured along the walls of the octagonal Cappella dei Principi (Chapel of the Princes) that was built as one of two chapels in the architectural complex of the Basilica of San Lorenzo, in Florence, Italy, for the de' Medici family. Purple porphyry was used lavishly throughout the opulent chapel as well, with a revetment of marbles, inlaid with other colored marbles and semi-precious stone, that covers the walls completely. Envisioned by Cosimo I, Grand Duke of Tuscany (1537–1574), it was initiated by Ferdinand I de' Medici, following a design by Matteo Nigetti that won an informal competition held in 1602 by Don Giovanni de' Medici (a son of Cosimo I), which was altered somewhat during execution by Buontalenti.

The tomb of Napoleon at Les Invalides in Paris, designed by architect Louis Visconti, is centered on the deceased emperor's sarcophagus that often has been described as made of red porphyry although this is incorrect. Napoleon's sarcophagus is made of quartzite, however, its pedestal is made of green andesite porphyry from Vosges. The sarcophagus of Arthur Wellesley, 1st Duke of Wellington at St Paul's Cathedral was completed in 1858. and was made from a single piece of Cornish porphyry, of a type called luxullianite, which was found in a field near Lostwithiel.

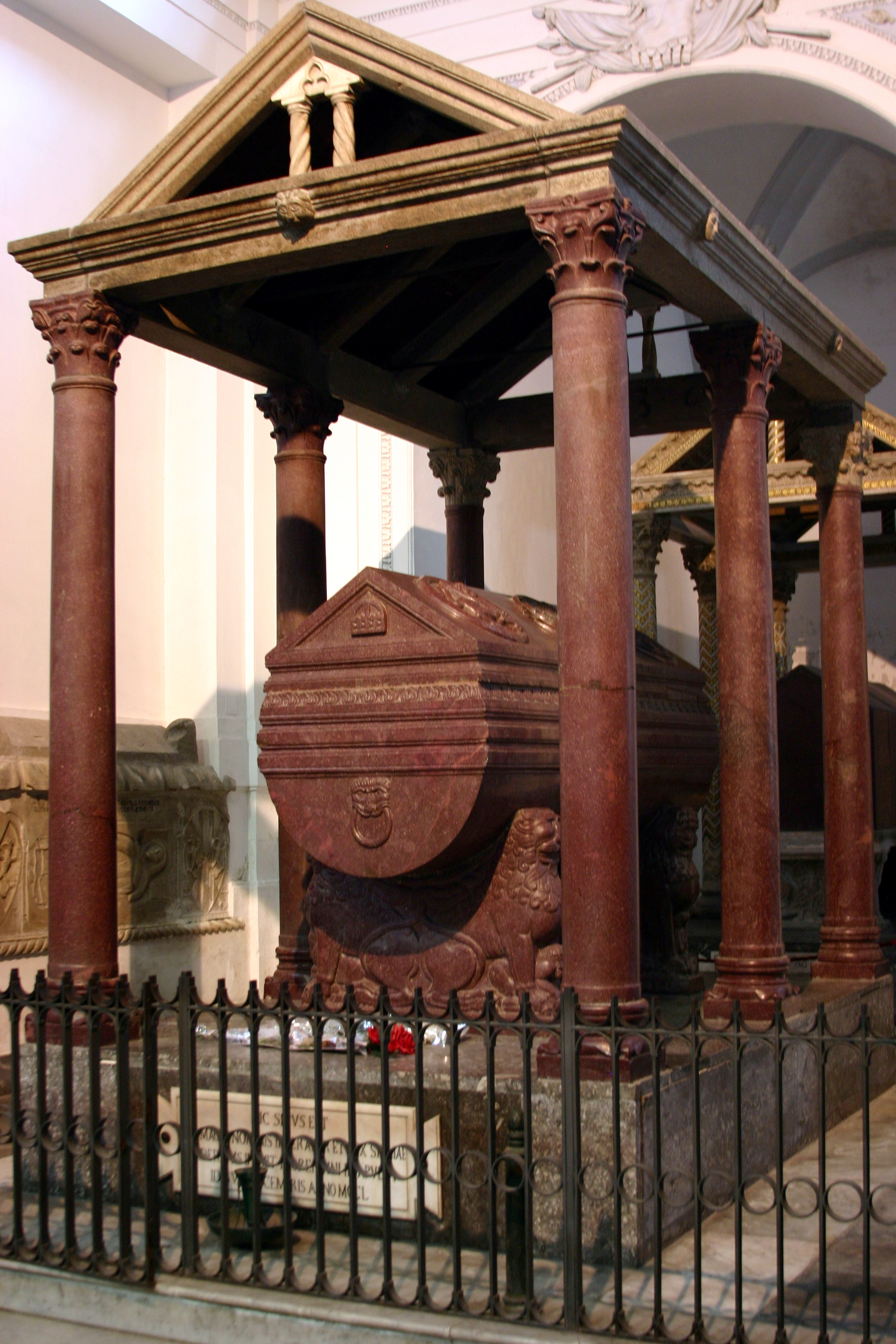
Sarcophagus of Frederick II in Palermo Cathedral, Sicily, made of porphyry

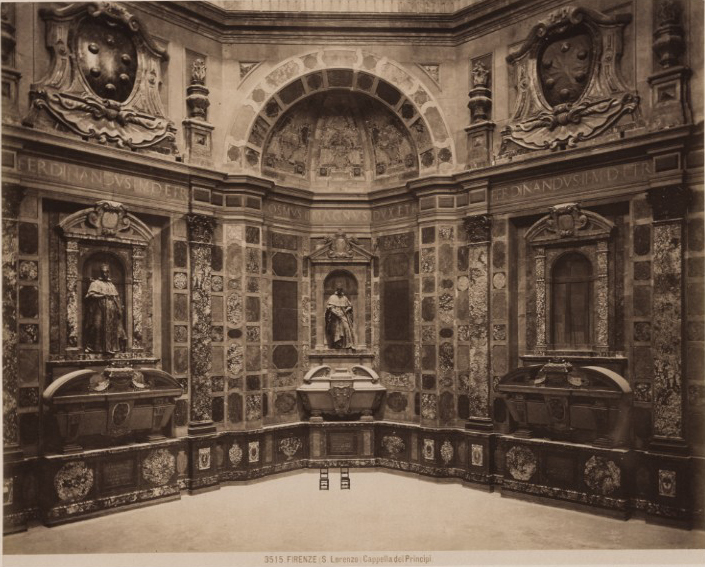
Interior of the de' Medici Cappella dei Principi in Florence (1870s photograph)

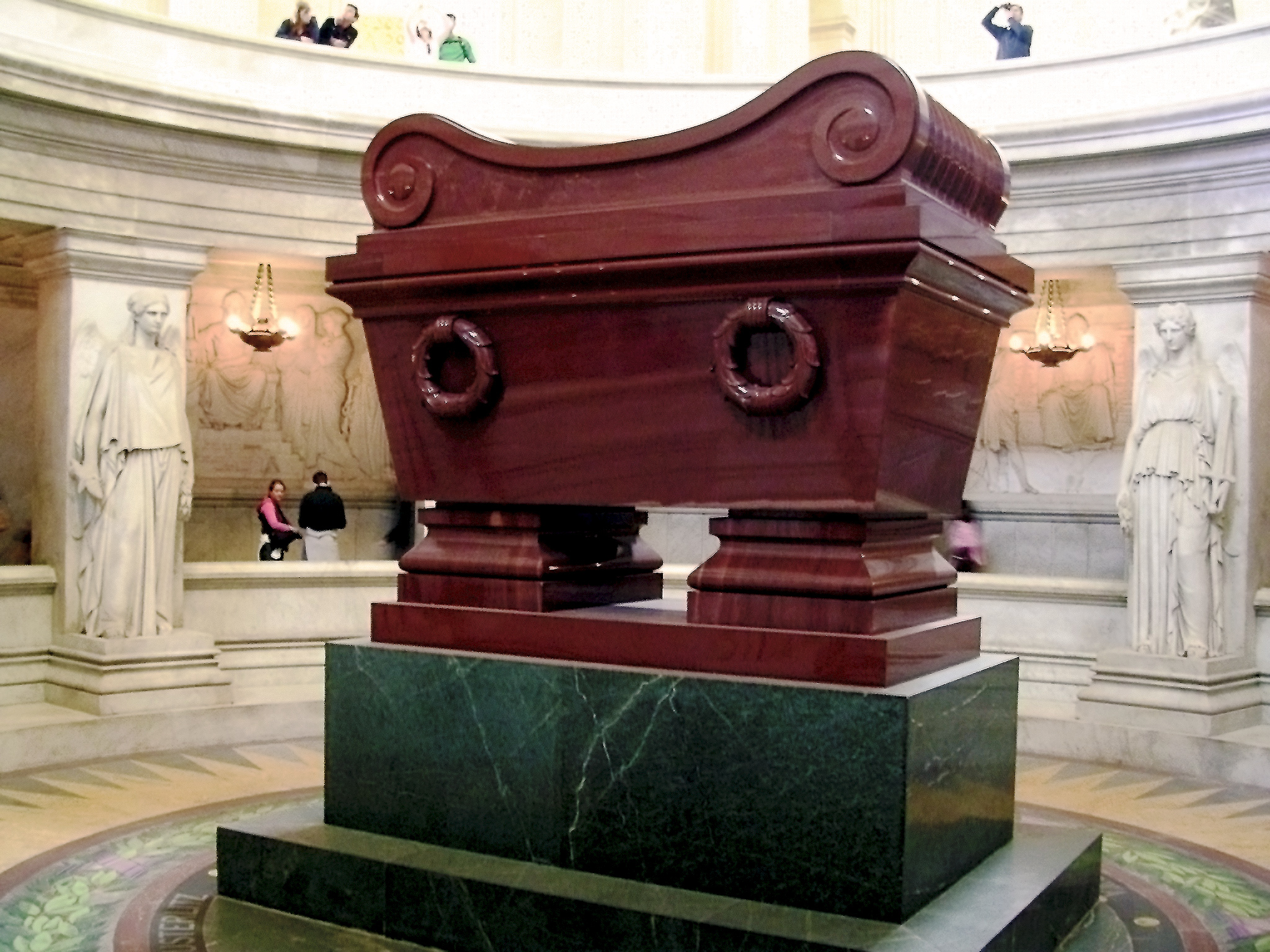
Sarcophagus of Napoleon in Les Invalides, Paris, made of quartzite with a pedestal of green porphyry

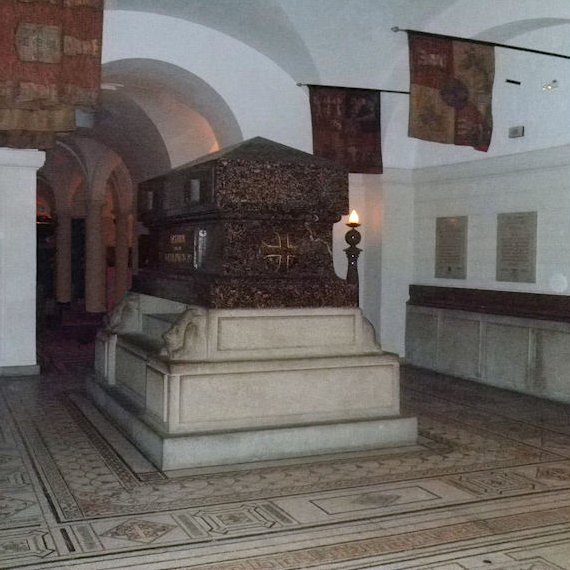
Wellington's sarcophagus in the crypt of St Paul's in London made from a single block of luxullianite porphyry

== Modern uses ==
In countries where many automobiles have studded winter tires such as Sweden, Finland, and Norway, it is common that highways are paved with asphalt made of porphyry aggregate to make the wearing course and withstand the extreme wear from the spiked winter tires.

== See also ==
- List of rock textures – List of rock textural and morphological terms
- Mons Porphyrites – Group of ancient quarries in Egypt
- Quartz-porphyry – Type of volcanic rock containing large porphyritic crystals of quartz
- Sarcophagi of Helena and Constantina – Ancient Roman sarcophagi
