= Philadelphion =

Public square in Constantinople

Coordinates: 41°00′50.71″N 28°57′24.81″E

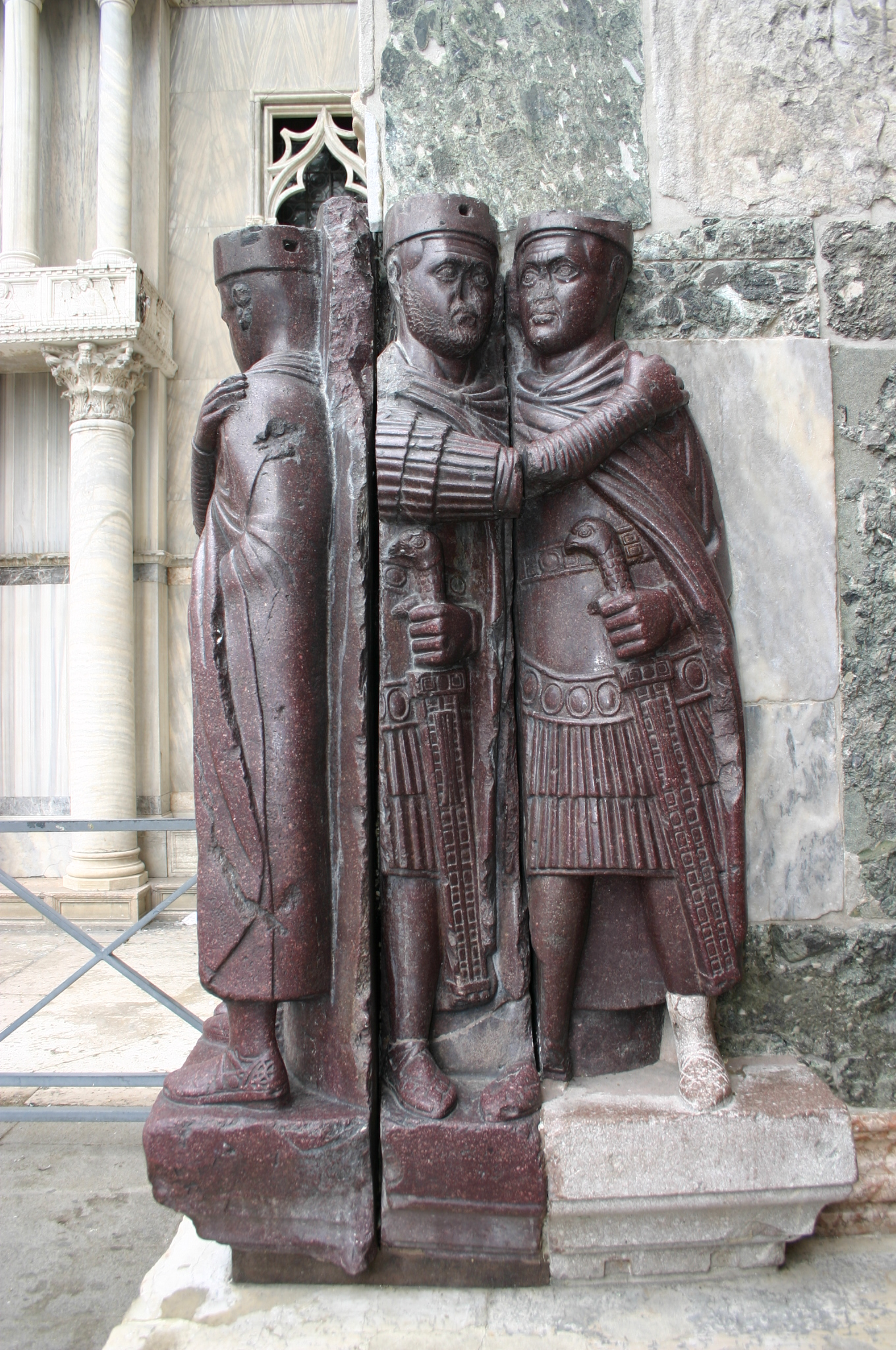
The two statue groups of the Portrait of the Four Tetrarchs in Venice, possibly originally located at the Philadelphion

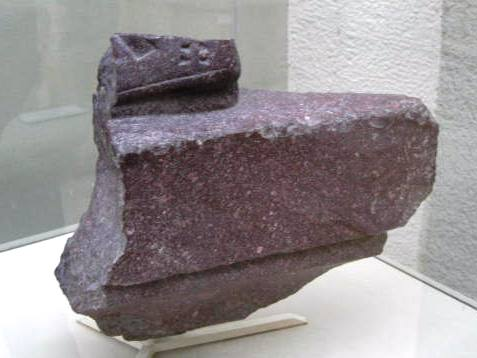
Missing heel portion kept in the Istanbul Archaeology Museum

The Philadelphion was a public square located in Constantinople.

== Location ==
After passing the Forum of Theodosius, the Mese Odos (the main road of Constantinople) branched into two directions. One led to the quarter known today as Yedikule, via the Aksaray and Cerrahpaşa quarters. The other passed through the quarters of Şehzadebaşı and Fatih until reaching the quarter of Edirnekapı (formerly the Gate of Charisius). The space where the road forked was thought to be the physical centre, or mesomphalos, of the city.

== History ==
According to the 8th-century Parastaseis syntomoi chronikai, the site of the later Philadelphion was originally known as the Proteichisma ("fore-wall"), and the site of a gate in the city wall built by Emperor Carus (r. 282–283). Raymond Janin suggested that this Proteichisma was an outer defensive wall protecting the wall erected by Septimius Severus (r. 193–211) during his rebuilding of Byzantium, possibly indicating that the city had already expanded beyond the Severan wall. The Parastaseis record the presence of statues of Constantine the Great (r. 306–337), his mother Helena, and his sons, seated on thrones, around a large four-sided porphyry column, topped by a gilded cross and marked with the sign of a sponge at the base, as well as statues of Julian the Apostate and his wife, whom the Parastaseis erroneously records as Anastasia. Perhaps this was a statue of Constantine's sister Anastasia. According to the Parastaseis, the column was erected by Constantine to commemorate his having a heavenly vision of the cross at the site; modern scholarship however considers the monument complex to be of later date, commemorating the finding of the True Cross by Helena. The Patria of Constantinople furthermore records that statues of two sons of Constantine seated on thrones stood opposite from the column. These statues apparently survived until the early 15th century, when they were popularly known as the "True Judges".

The Parastaseis records that the place received the name Philadelphion ("place of brotherly love") from a statue group showing the meeting of Constantine's three sons there after Constantine's death in 337 and their embrace as a sign of mutual devotion and support. The event never actually took place—Constantine's sons only met briefly in Pannonia after his death—but the statue probably existed, similar to another three-headed statue of Constantine and two of his sons, Constans and Constantius, which the Parastaseis record as lost at sea at the time of Theodosius II (r. 402–450), symbolizing concord in the imperial family. In 1958, P. Verzone identified the statue groups known as the "Tetrarchs", which was plundered during the Fourth Crusade in 1204, brought to Venice, and incorporated into the St Mark's Basilica, with the statues mentioned in the Parastaseis. This identification was reinforced by the discovery of a missing fragment from the statue group near the Bodrum Mosque, but as the editors of the Parastaseis point out, "there are too many discrepancies between those groups and Parastaseis's descriptions here to permit any certainty". Given the inaccuracy of the historical details in the Parastaseis, it is possible that even the identification with Constantine's sons is wrong, while it is unclear from the phrasing of the text whether this monument survived until the 8th century, or whether it had been destroyed long before.

== Sources ==
- Cameron, Averil; Herrin, Judith (1984). Constantinople in the Early Eighth Century. The Parastaseis Syntomoi Chronikai: Introduction, Translation, and Commentary. Brill Archive. ISBN 9004070109.
- Janin, Raymond (1964). Constantinople byzantine. Développement urbaine et répertoire topographique (in French). Paris.
- Striker, Cecil L. (1981). The Myrelaion (Bodrum Camii) in Istanbul. Princeton, NJ: Princeton University Press.
- Verzone, P. (1958). "I due gruppi in porfido di San Marco in Venezia ed il Philadelphion in Costantinopoli". Palladio (in Italian). 8: 8–14.
