= Şehzadebaşı =

- Quarter
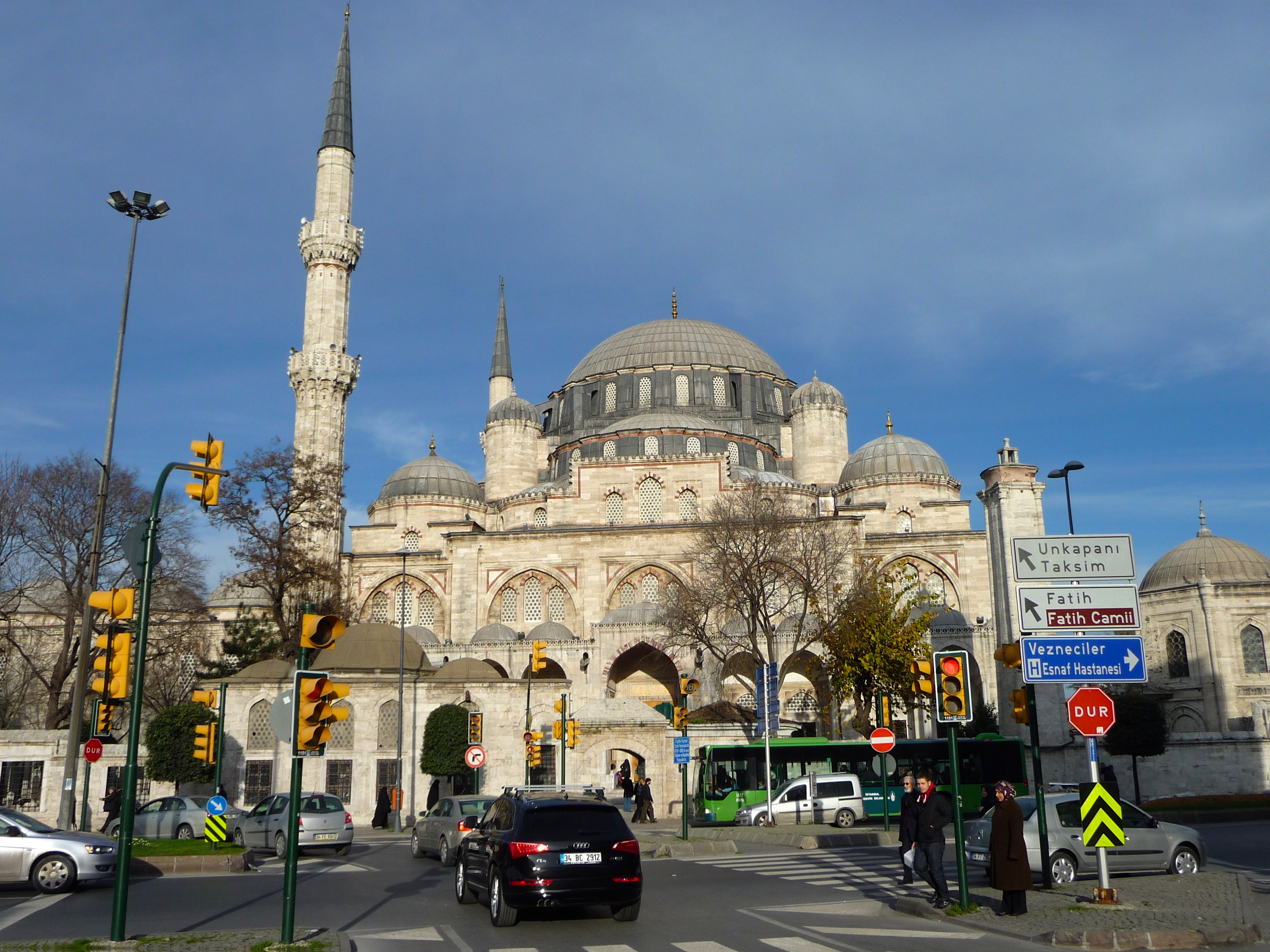

- Location within Istanbul Fatih
- Country: Turkey
- Region: Marmara
- Province: Istanbul
- District: Fatih
- Time zone: UTC+3 (TRT)
- Area code: 0212

Şehzadebaşı is a quarter (Turkish: semt) of the Fatih district in the European part of Istanbul. Although its exact boundaries cannot be drawn as it is a quarter, administratively it covers part of the mahalle of Kemalpaşa and Kalenderhane. It is a busy centre due to its proximity to the quarter of Saraçhane, Vezneciler and Unkapanı.

== Landmarks ==
It hosts the Şehzade Mosque, one of the first works of Mimar Sinan.

== Transportation ==
The quarter is served by the M2 metro line, which came into service in March 2014, with a station at Vezneciler.
