= Ottoman decoration =

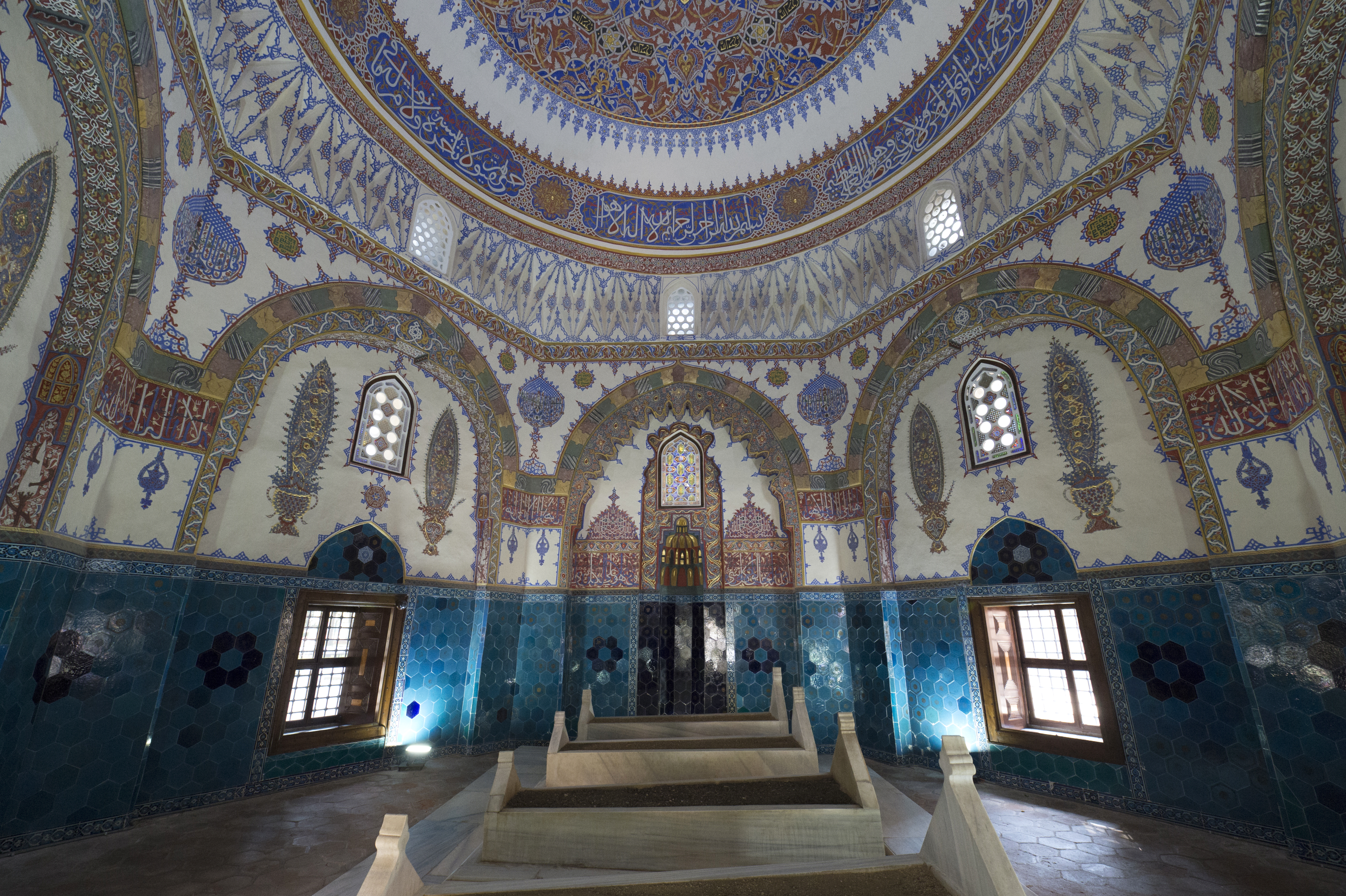
The Tomb of Cem in the Muradiye Complex in Bursa, built in the late 15th century. The tomb contains relatively well-preserved examples of painted decoration from this era (upper walls), as well as single-colour hexagonal tiles (possibly dated to 1429) that are typical of early tilework.

Decoration in Ottoman architecture takes on several forms, the most prominent of which include tile decoration, painted decoration, and stone carving. Beginning in the 14th century, early Ottoman decoration was largely a continuation of earlier Seljuk styles in Anatolia as well as other predominant styles of decoration found in Islamic art and architecture at the time. Over the course of the next few centuries, a distinctive Ottoman repertoire of motifs evolved, mostly floral motifs, such as rumî, hatayî, and saz styles. Calligraphic inscriptions, most characteristically in a thuluth script, were also a mainstay. From the 18th century onward, this repertoire became increasingly influenced by Western European art and architecture and went as far as directly borrowing techniques and styles from the latter.

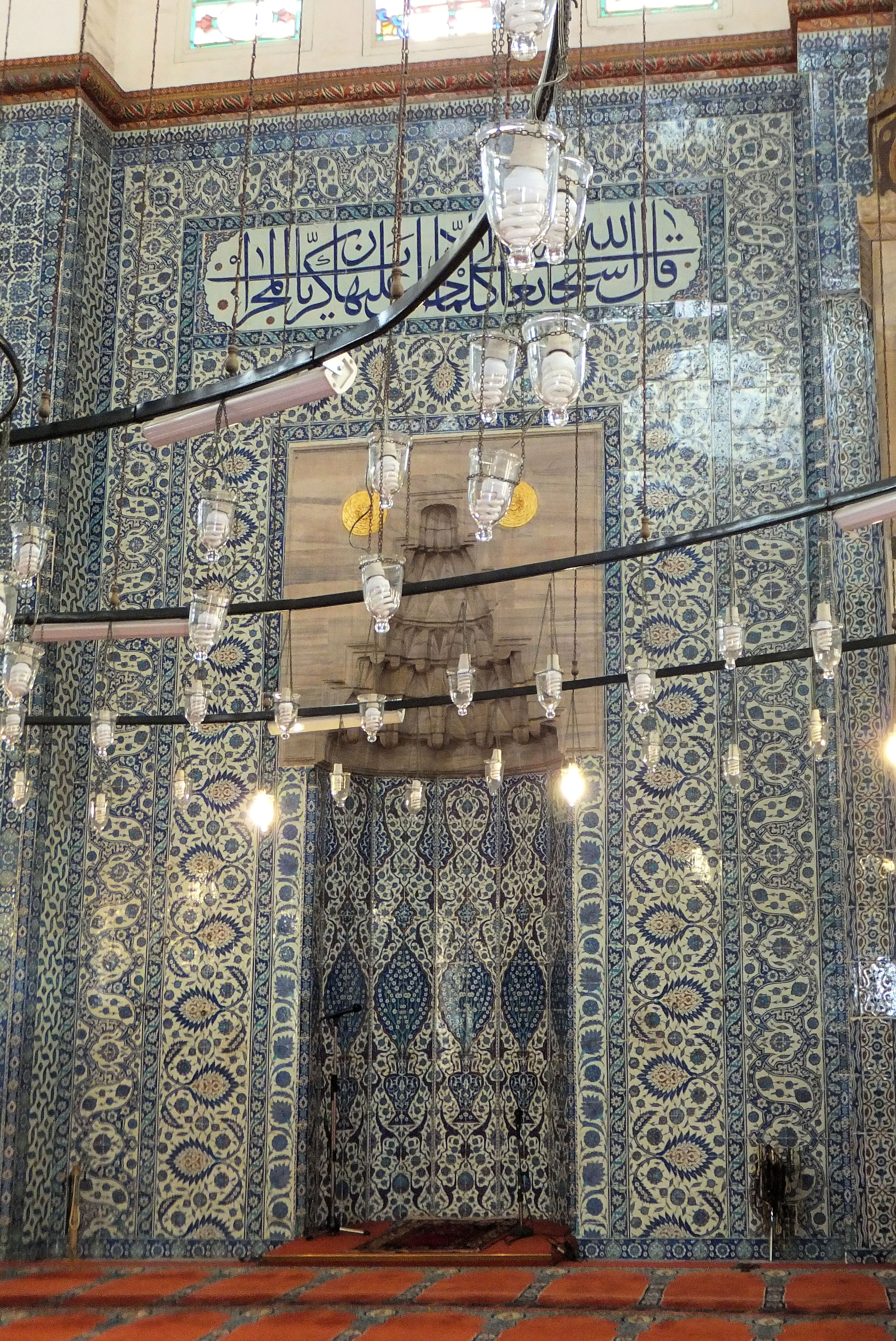
Mihrab of the Rüstem Pasha Mosque (1561–2), showing typical 16th-century decoration. The walls are covered with Iznik tiles at the beginning of their richest artistic phase, while in the center is a stone-carved muqarnas hood.

Ottoman tiles attained a prominent role in decoration. Starting in the early 15th century, cuerda seca tiles in vivid colours were widely used in various buildings, using mostly vegetal arabesque motifs, of which the most dramatic early example is the Green Mosque and Green Tomb in Bursa (circa 1424). Various examples of tilework from this century seem to show possible Iranian influence and connections to Timurid art. A distinctive style of blue-and-white fritware, influenced by Chinese motifs and often attributed to an early stage of Iznik tilework, is evidenced by the late 15th century and characterizes the early 16th century. Iznik tiles became highly favoured during the rest of the 16th century and reached their artistic peak in the second half of the century. They featured stylized floral and vegetal motifs in blue, white, red, and green colours. The Iznik industry declined by the end of the 17th century, with production of lower-quality tiles shifting to Kütahya. In the early 18th century, a revival of tile art was attempted through the establishment of a new workshop at Tekfursaray in Istanbul, but ultimately the industry faded after this and tile decoration lost its importance.

Painted decoration is a highly visible feature of Ottoman interiors, especially in domes and on upper walls. However, buildings were frequently repainted during later restorations and, as a result, relatively little of the original painted decoration in mosques and palaces has been preserved up to the present day. Surviving examples show that painted designs were related to those of other mediums, including tiles and manuscript decoration, and that floral motifs predominated. Until the 16th century, these motifs remained rather formal and stylized, but from the late 17th century onward they began to change under increasing Western European influence. By the 19th century, European-style motifs were directly incorporated into Ottoman decoration and European techniques such as trompe-l'œil were introduced.

Compared to earlier Seljuk decoration, stone carving occupied a more subtle role in Ottoman architecture. Until the classical period (16th–17th centuries), three-dimensional muqarnas or "stalactite" decoration was the most prominent motif used in entrance portals, niches, columns capitals, and under minaret balconies. Starting in the 18th century, motifs influenced by or borrowed from the European Baroque took over.

== Tile decoration ==
=== Early Ottoman tilework ===
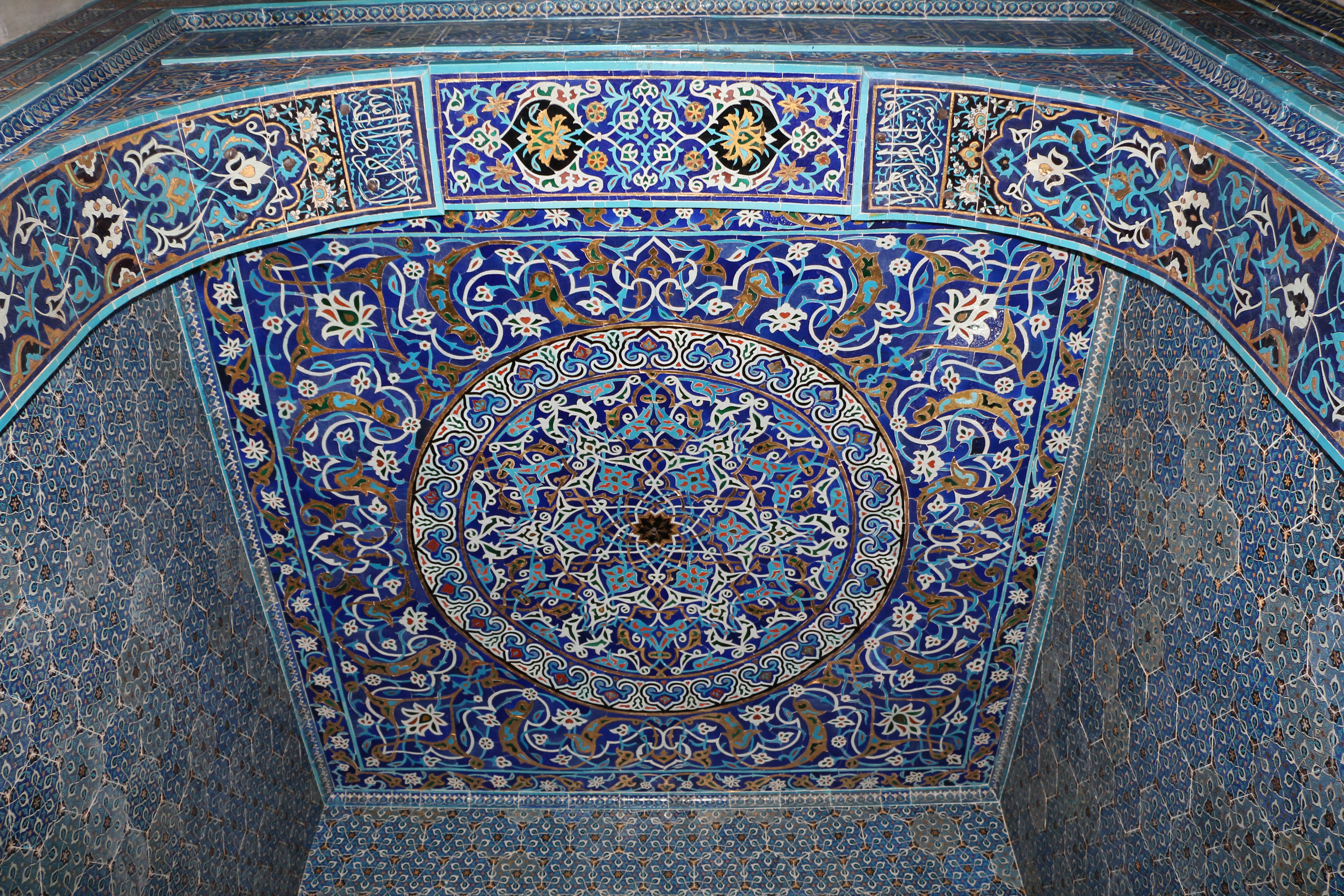
Tile decoration in the Green Mosque in Bursa (1424)

Some of the earliest known tile decoration in Ottoman architecture is found in the Green Mosque in Iznik (late 14th century), whose minaret incorporates glazed tiles forming patterns in the brickwork (although the current tiles are modern restorations). This technique was inherited from the earlier Seljuk period. Glazed tile decoration in the cuerda seca technique was used in other early Ottoman monuments, particularly in the Green Mosque and the associated Green Tomb in Bursa (early 15th century). The tiles of the Green Mosque complex generally have a deep green ground mixed with combinations of blue, white, and yellow forming arabesque motifs. A large portion of the tiles are cut into hexagonal and triangular shapes that were then fitted together to form murals. Some of the tiles are further enhanced with arabesque motifs applied in gilt gold glazing over these colours. Inscriptions in the mosque record that the decoration was completed in 1424 by Nakkaş Ali, a craftsman native to Bursa who had been transported to Samarkand by Timur after the Ottoman defeat at the Battle of Ankara in 1402. In Samarkand, he was exposed to Timurid architecture and decoration and brought this artistic experience back with him later. Other inscriptions record the tilemakers as being "Masters of Tabriz", suggesting that craftsmen of Iranian origin were involved. Tabriz was historically a major center of ceramic art in the Islamic world, and its artists appear to have emigrated and worked in many regions from Central Asia to Egypt. The artistic style of these tiles – and of other Ottoman art – was influenced by an "International Timurid" taste that emerged from the intense artistic patronage of the Timurids, who controlled a large empire across the region. Doğan Kuban argues that the decoration of the Green Mosque complex was more generally a product of collaboration between craftsmen of different regions, as this was the practice in Anatolian Islamic art and architecture during the preceding centuries.

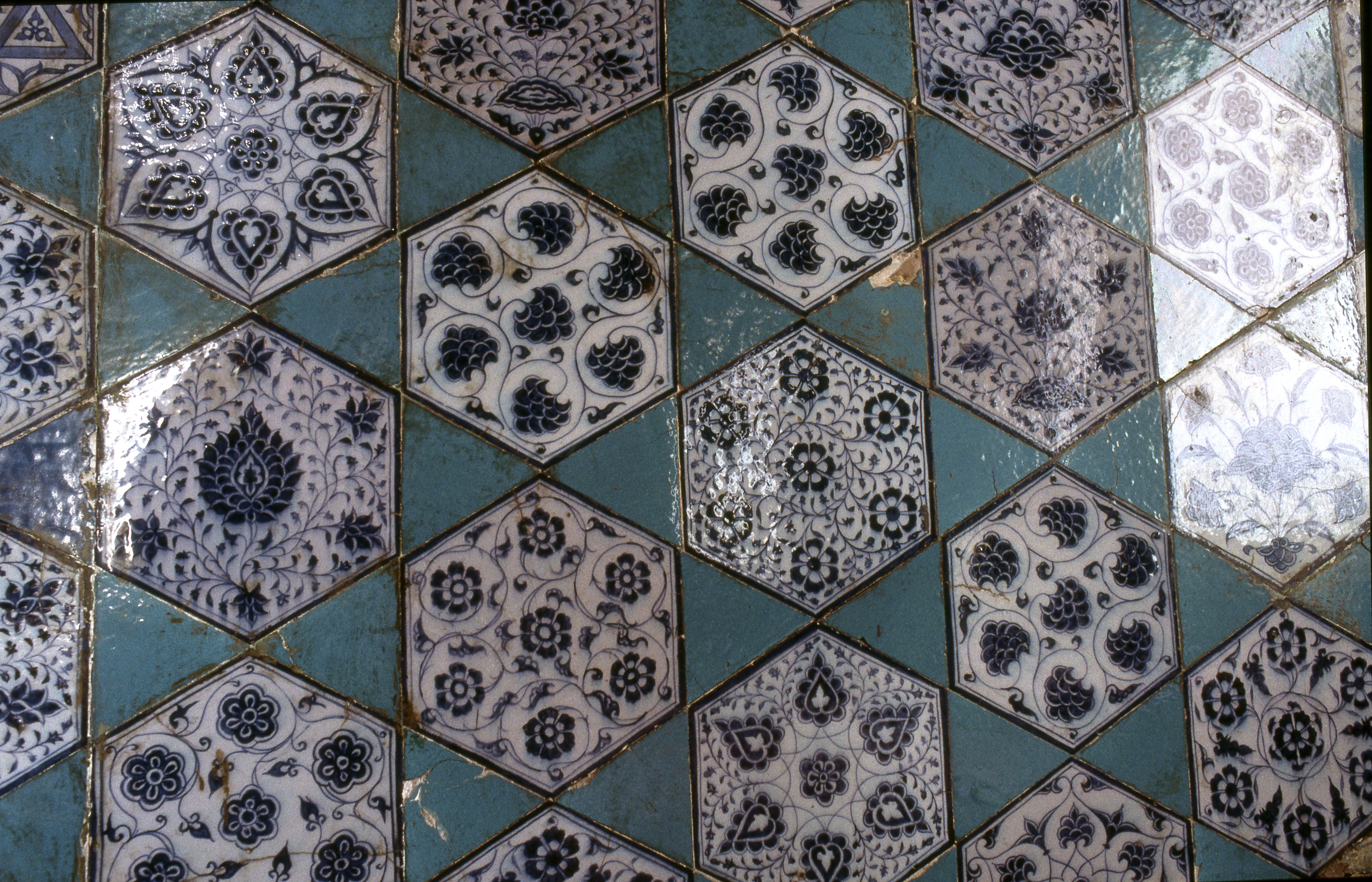
Blue and white tilework with Chinese influences at the Murad II Mosque in Edirne (circa 1435)

The same kind of tilework is found in the mihrab of the Murad II Mosque in Edirne, completed in 1435. However, this mosque also contains the first examples of a new technique and style of tiles with underglaze blue on a white background, with touches of turquoise. This technique is found on the tiles that cover the muqarnas hood of the mihrab and in the mural of hexagonal tiles along the lower walls of the prayer hall. The motifs on these tiles include lotuses and camellia-like flowers on spiral stems. These chinoiserie-like motifs, along with the focus on blue and white colours, most likely reflect an influence from contemporary Chinese porcelain – although the evidence for Chinese porcelain reaching Edirne at this time is unclear. Tilework panels with similar techniques and motifs are found in the courtyard of the Üç Şerefeli Mosque, another building commissioned by Murad II in Edirne, completed in 1437.

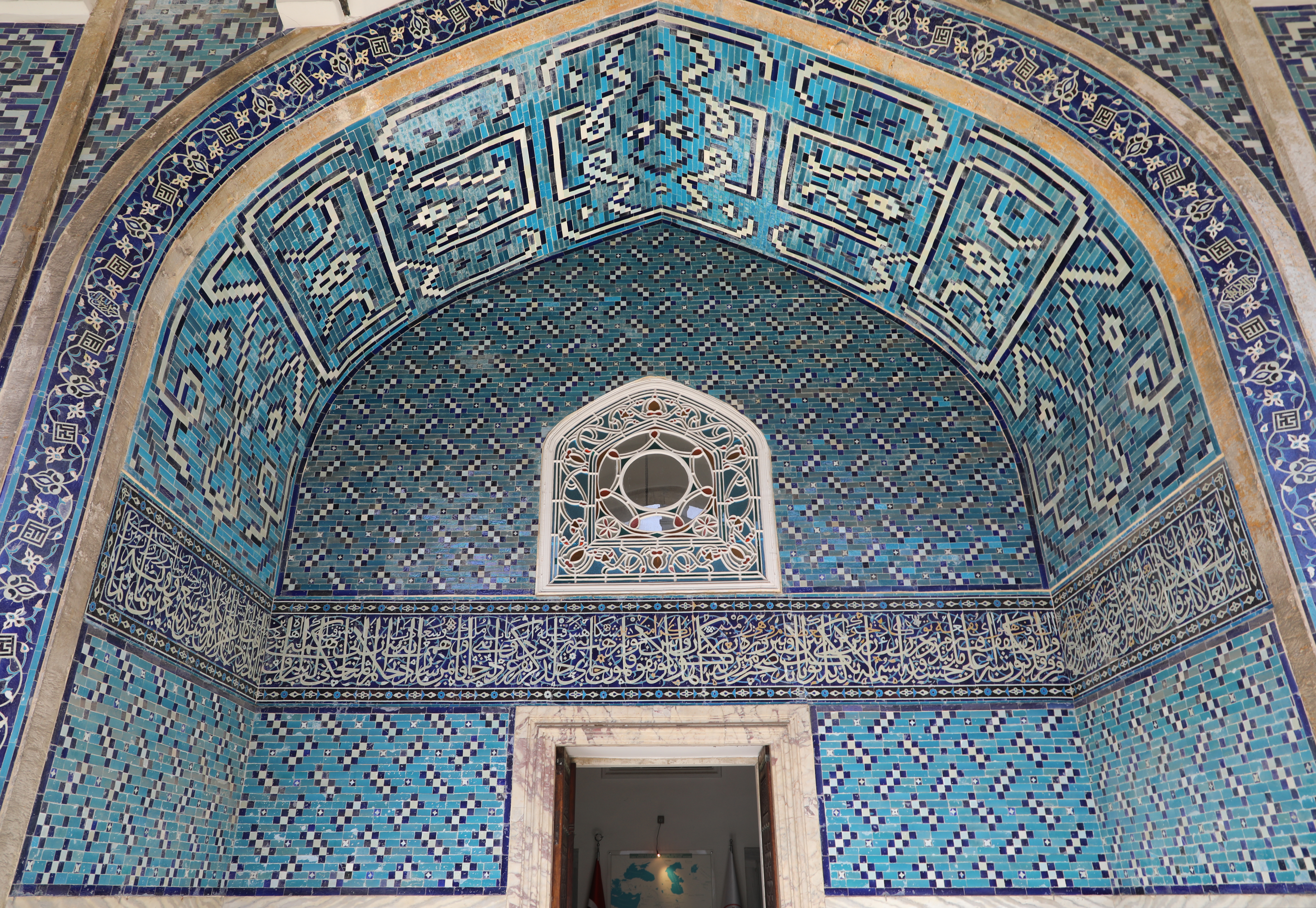
Entrance iwan of the Tiled Kiosk at Topkapı Palace (1472), with Iranian-style tilework based on the banna'i technique

The evidence from this tilework in Bursa and Edirne indicates the existence of a group or a school of craftsmen, the "Masters of Tabriz", who worked for imperial workshops in the first half of the 15th century and were familiar with both cuerda seca and underglaze techniques. As the Ottoman imperial court moved from Bursa to Edirne, they too moved with it. However, their work does not clearly appear anywhere after this period. Later on, the Tiled Kiosk in Istanbul, completed in 1472 for Mehmed II's New Palace (Topkapı Palace), is notably decorated with Iranian-inspired banna'i tilework. The builders were likely of Iranian origin, as historical documents indicate the presence of tilecutters from Khorasan, but not much is known about them. Another unique example of tile decoration in Istanbul around the same period is found on the Tomb of Mahmud Pasha, built in 1473 as part of the Mahmud Pasha Mosque complex. Its exterior is covered in a mosaic of turquoise and indigo tiles inset into the sandstone walls to form geometric star patterns. The work still reflects a traditional style of Anatolian or Persian tile decoration similar to older Timurid examples.

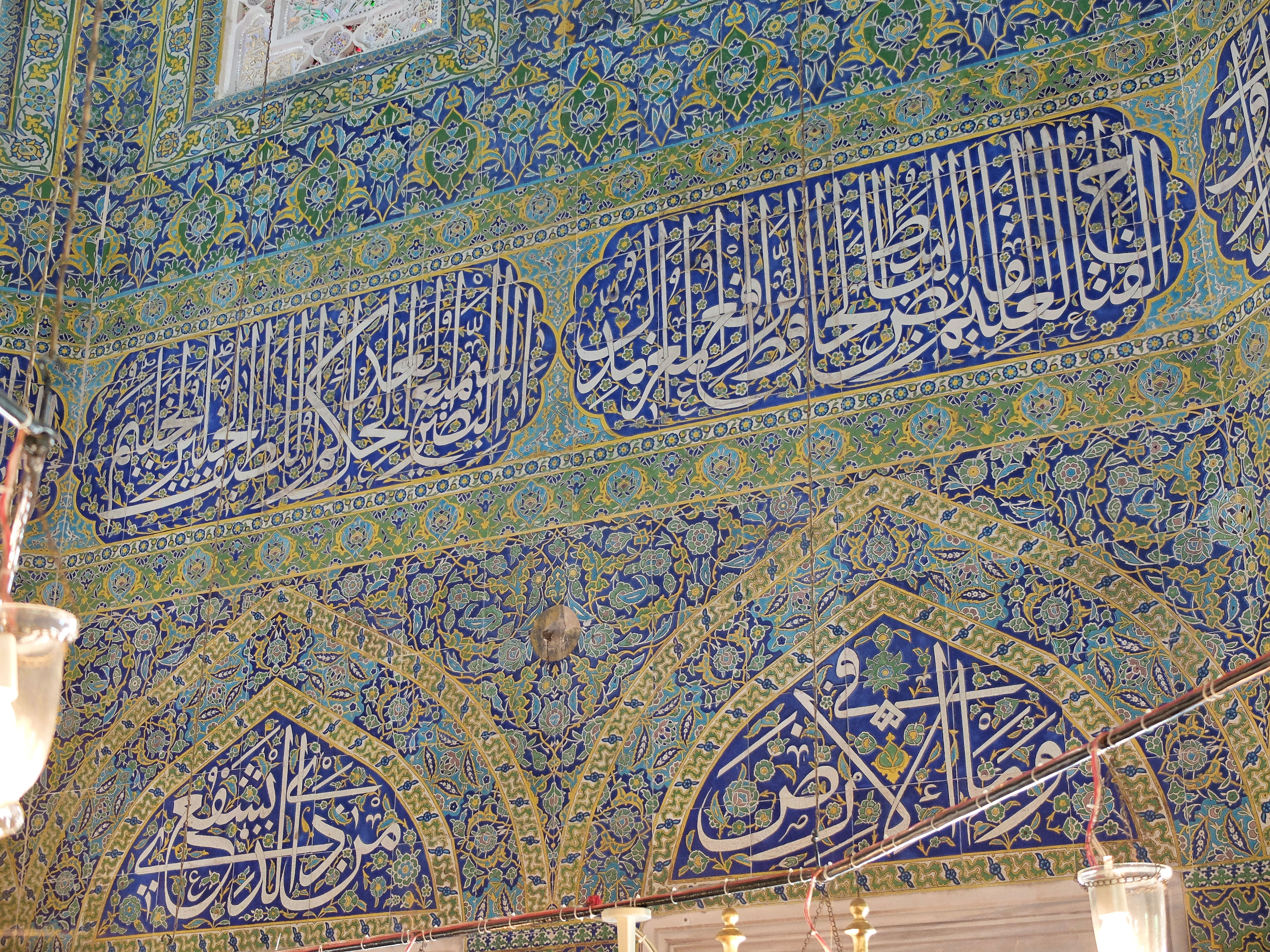
Cuerda seca tilework in the tomb of Şehzade Mehmed in Istanbul (1548)

Another stage in Ottoman tiles is evident in the surviving tiles of the Fatih Mosque (1463–70) and in the Selim I Mosque (1520–22). In these mosques the windows are topped by lunettes filled with cuerda seca tiles with motifs in green, turquoise, cobalt blue, and yellow. Chinese motifs such as dragons and clouds also appear for the first time on similar tiles in Selim I's tomb, built behind his mosque in 1523. A more extravagant example of this type of tilework can be found inside the tomb of Şehzade Mehmed in the cemetery of the Şehzade Mosque (1548). Further examples can be found in a few religious structures designed by Sinan in this period, such as the Haseki Hürrem Complex (1539). The latest example of it is in the Kara Ahmet Pasha Mosque (1555), once again in the lunettes above the windows of the courtyard. Many scholars traditionally attribute these Ottoman tiles to craftsmen that Selim I brought back from Tabriz after his victory at the Battle of Chaldiran. Doğan Kuban argues that this assumption is unnecessary if one considers the artistic continuity between these tiles and earlier Ottoman tiles as well as the fact that the Ottoman state had always employed craftsmen from different parts of the Islamic world. John Carswell, a professor of Islamic art, states that the tiles are the work of an independent imperial workshop based in Istanbul that worked from Iranian traditions. Godfrey Goodwin suggests that the style of tiles does not correspond to either the old "Masters of Tabriz" school or to an Iranian workshop, and therefore may represent an early phase of tilework from Iznik; an "early Iznik" style.

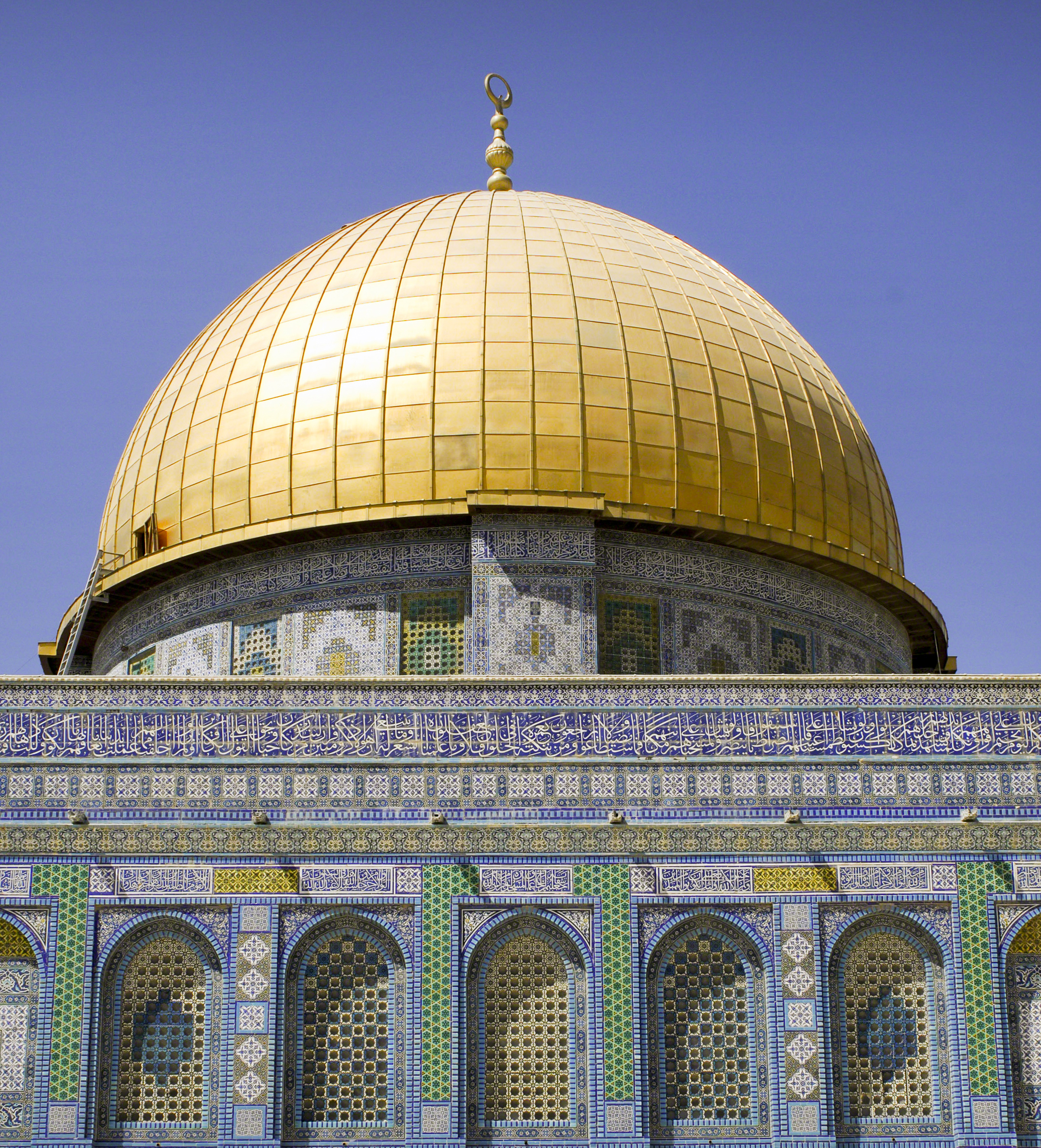
Tile decoration on the Dome of the Rock in Jerusalem, added during Suleiman's reign

An important case of Ottoman tile decoration outside the imperial capitals around this time was the refurbishment of the Dome of the Rock in Jerusalem ordered by Sultan Suleiman. During the refurbishment, the exterior of the building was covered in tilework which replaced the older Umayyad mosaic decoration. Inscriptions in the tiles give the date 1545–46, but work probably continued until the end of Suleiman's reign (1566). The name of one of the craftsmen is recorded as Abdallah of Tabriz. The tilework includes many different styles and techniques, including cuerda seca tiles, colourful underglaze tiles, and mosaic blue-and-white tilework. The tiles seem to have been fabricated locally rather than at centers like Iznik, despite the absence of a sophisticated ceramic production center in the region. The identification of Abdallah of Tabriz may also indicate that the tiles were commissioned from the same workshop of Iranian craftsmen who produced earlier Ottoman tiles. This project is also notable as one of the few cases of extensive tile decoration applied to the exterior of a building in Ottoman architecture. This major restoration work in Jerusalem may have also played a role in Ottoman patrons developing a taste for tiles, such as those made in Iznik (which was closer to the capital).

=== Classical Iznik tiles ===
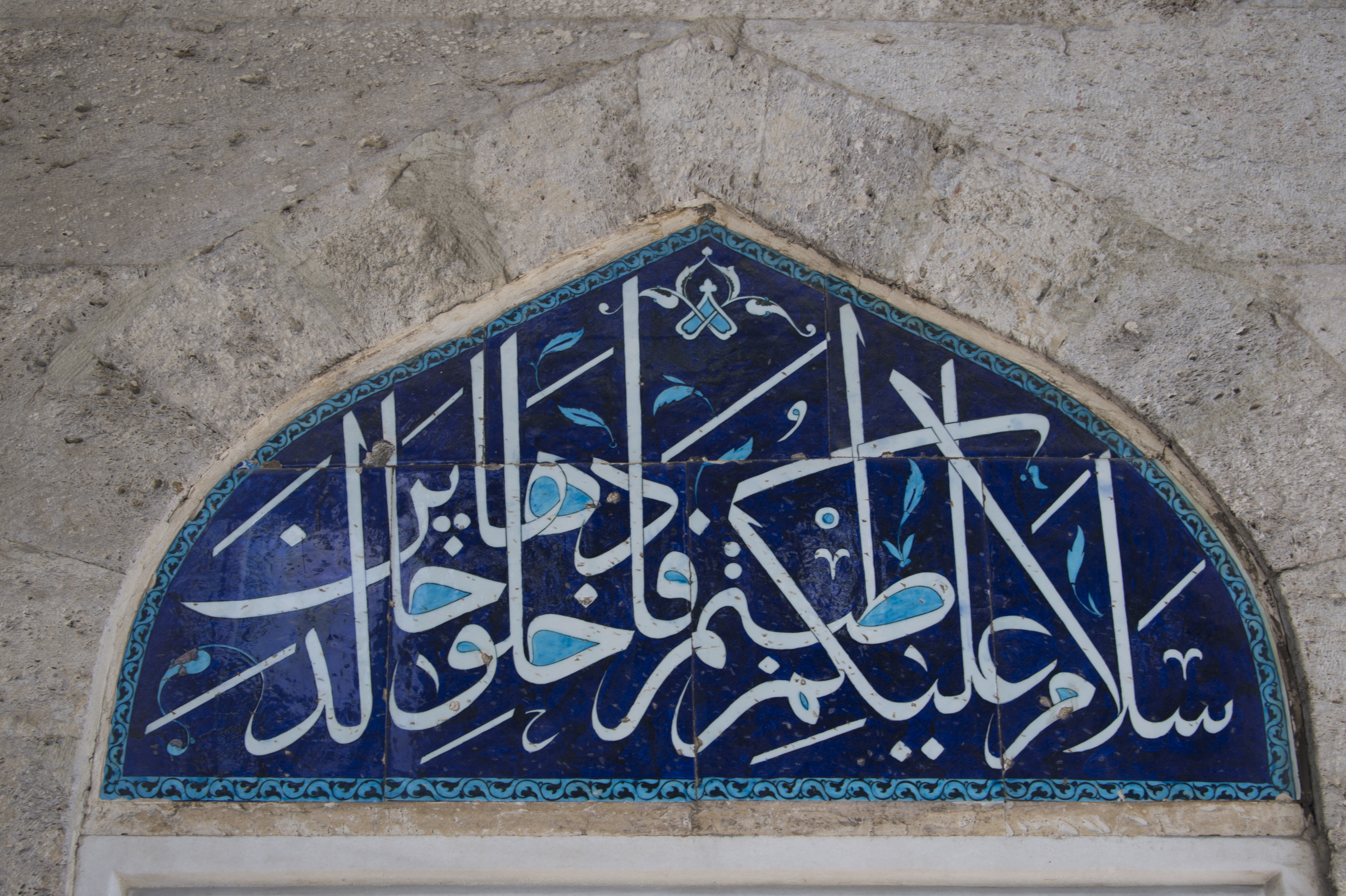
Blue-and-white Iznik tiles in the Hadim Ibrahim Pasha Mosque in Istanbul (1551)

The city of Iznik had been a center of pottery production under the Ottomans since the 15th century, but until the mid-16th century it was mainly concerned with producing pottery vessels. There is little evidence of large-scale tile manufacture in Iznik before this time. In the late 15th century, in the 1470s or 1480s, the Iznik industry had grown in prominence and patronage and began producing a new "blue-and-white" fritware which adapted and incorporated Chinese motifs in its decoration. Some of these blue-and-white ceramics appear in tile form in the decoration in the Hafsa Hatun Mosque (1522) in Manisa and in the Çoban Mustafa Pasha Mosque (1523) in Gebze. The Hadim Ibrahim Pasha Mosque (1551) also contains panels of well-executed tiles featuring calligraphic and floral decoration in cobalt blue, white, olive green, turquoise, and pale manganese purple.

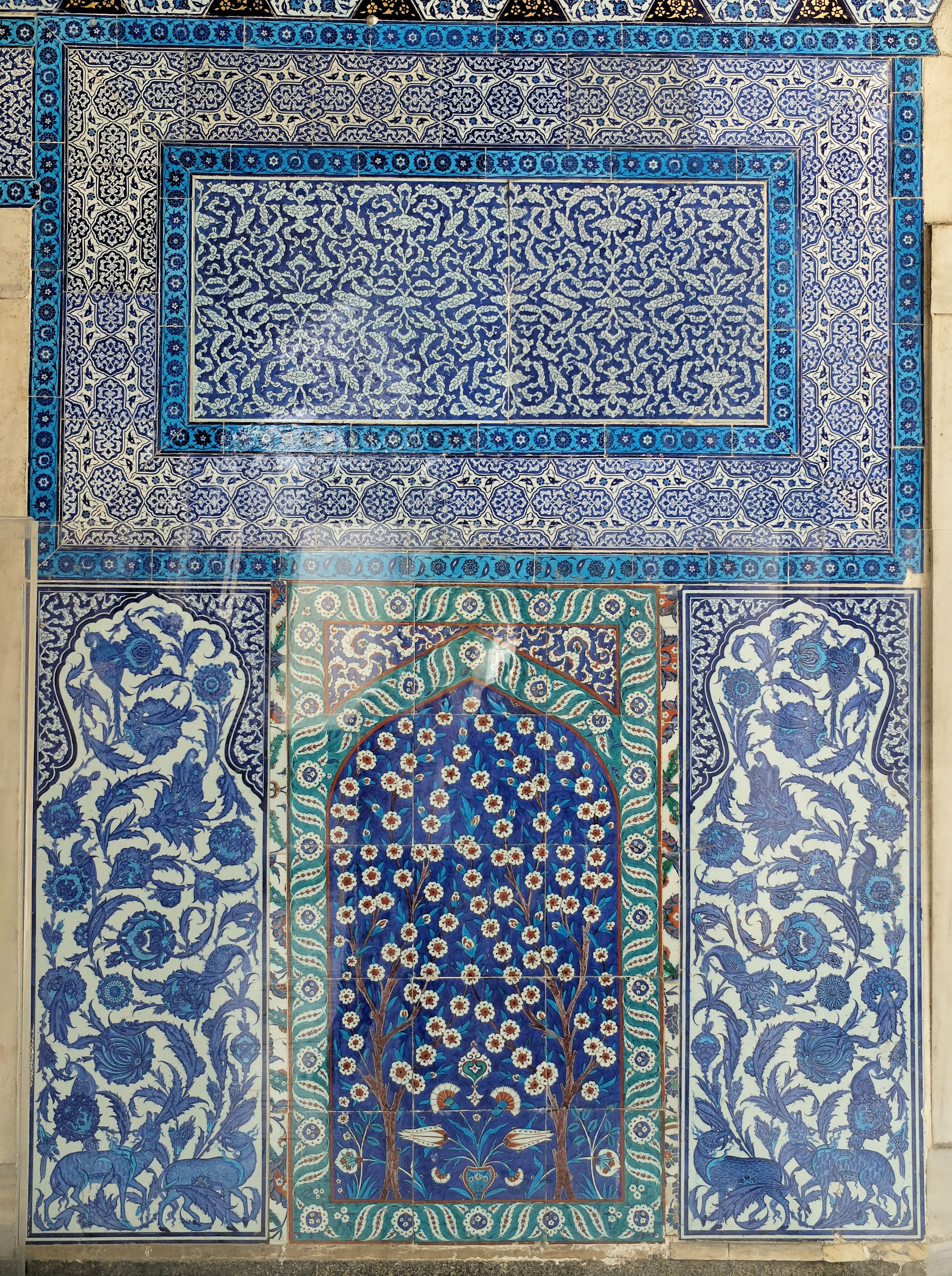
Tiles on the exterior of the Circumcision Room in Topkapı Palace (early 16th century, with tiles from later period in the lower middle)

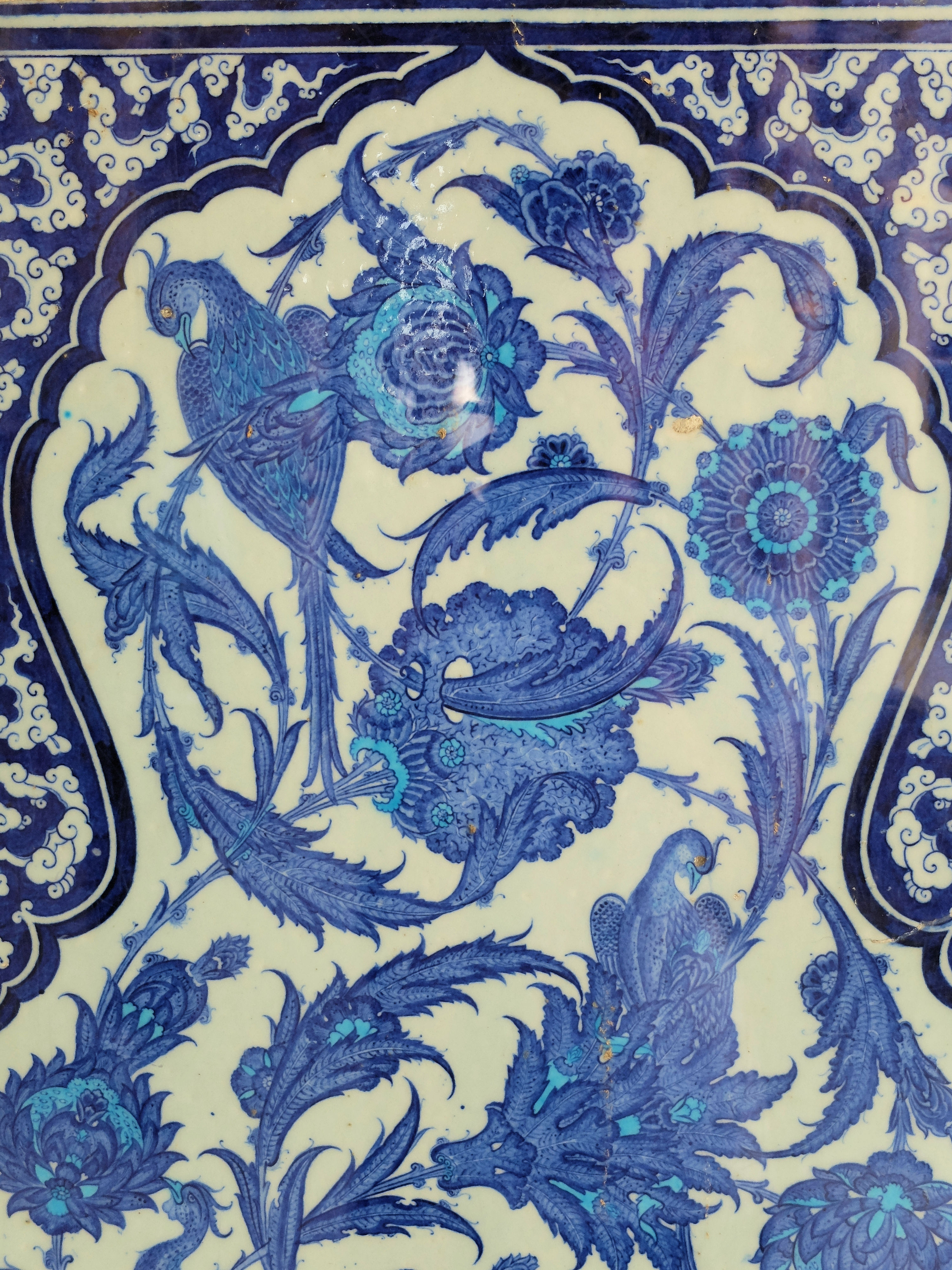
Details of blue-and-white tiles (early 16th century) on the exterior of the Circumcision Room

The most extraordinary tile panels from this period are a series of panels on the exterior of Circumcision Pavilion (Sünnet Odası) in Topkapı Palace. The tiles in this composition have been dated to various periods within the 16th century and some were probably moved here during a restoration of the pavilion in the first half of the 17th century. Nonetheless, at least some of the tiles are believed to date from the 1520s and feature large floral motifs in blue, white, and turquoise. Both the Topkapı tiles and the mosque tiles from this early-16th-century period are traditionally attributed to Iznik, but they may have been produced in Istanbul itself in ceramic workshops located at Tekfursaray. Even if they come from Tekfursaray, their style is related to the style of ceramics being made in Iznik around the same time. This includes the saz style: a motif in which a variety of flowers are attached to gracefully curving stems with serrated leaves. This continued to reflect earlier influences of the "International Timurid" style, but it also demonstrates the development of an increasingly distinct Ottoman artistic style at this time.

Ceramic art from Iznik reached its apogee in the second half of the 16th century, particularly with the advent of the "tomato red" colour in its compositions. At the same time, Iznik grew into its role as a major center of tile production rather than just dishware. Rather than merely highlighting certain architectural features (e.g. windows) with tile panels, large-scale murals of tilework became more common. For this purpose, square tiles were also now preferred over the hexagonal tiles of the older Iranian tradition. Floral motifs were dominant, but calligraphic inscriptions were also important and were generally rendered in a thuluth script. Unlike Byzantine mosaics, tiles were not well-suited to curved surfaces and as a result they were not used to decorate domes, which were decorated with painted motifs instead.

This was around the same time that Mimar Sinan, chief court architect, was also reaching the pinnacle of his career. Iznik ceramics and classical Ottoman architecture thus reached their greatest heights of achievement around the same time, during the reign of Suleiman and his immediate successors. Sinan generally used tile decoration in a fairly restrained manner and seems to have preferred focusing on the architecture as a whole rather than on overwhelming decoration. For example, Sinan's most celebrated works, the Süleymaniye Mosque (1550–57) and the Selimiye Mosque (1568–1574), feature tile decoration restricted to certain areas. Even the Sokollu Mehmed Pasha Mosque (1568–1572), which is known for its extensive high-quality tile decoration, still concentrates and focuses this decoration onto the wall surrounding the mihrab instead of on the whole mosque interior.

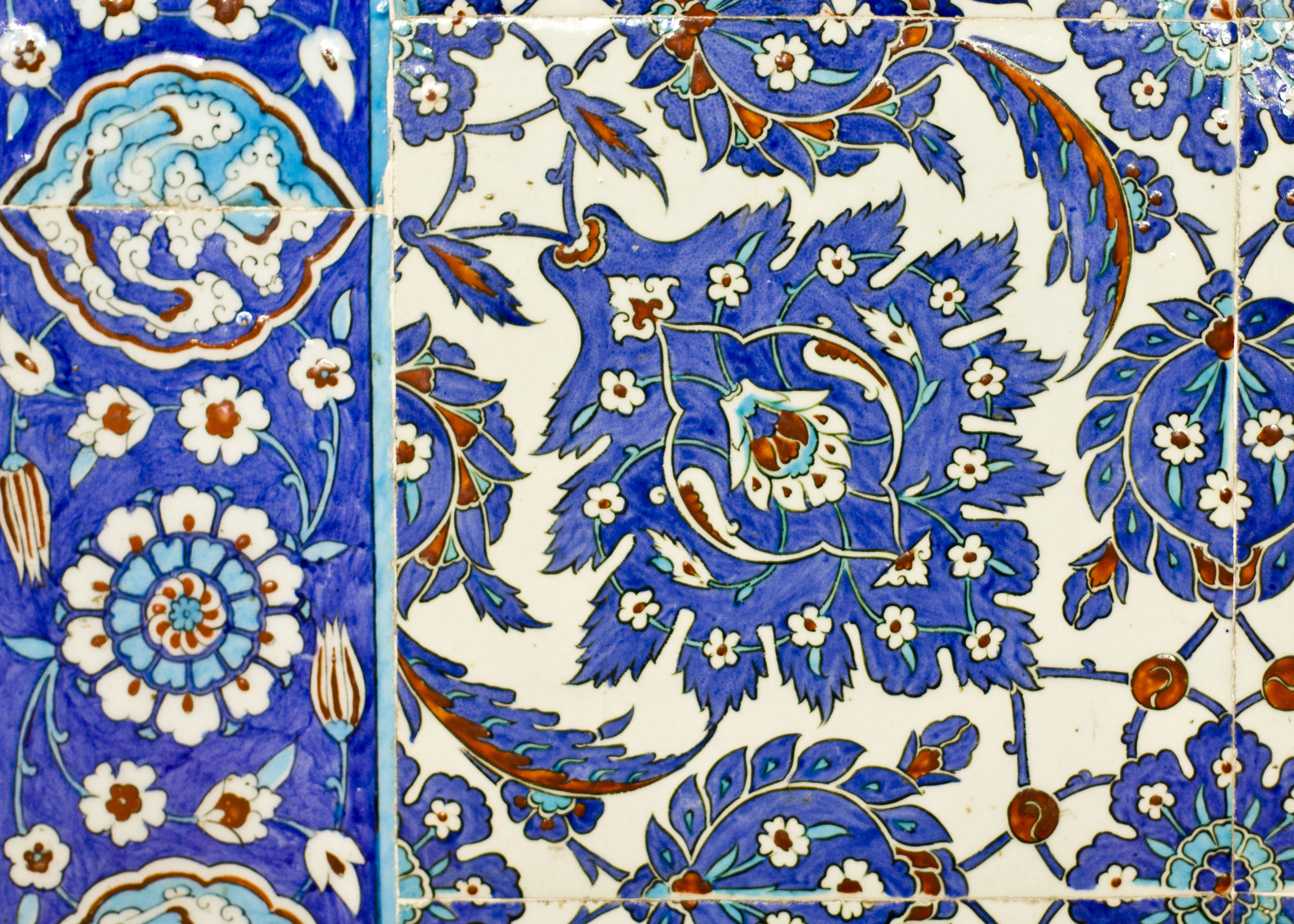
Details of tiles at the Rüstem Pasha Mosque (circa 1561), with early use of the "tomato red" colour

The major exception to this is the Rüstem Pasha Mosque (1561–62), whose interior and outer portico are extensively covered in Iznik tiles. The mosque is even regarded as a "museum" of Iznik tiles from this period. Judging by comparisons with Sinan's other works, the exceptional use of tilework in this mosque may have been due to a specific request by the wealthy patron, Rüstem Pasha, rather than a voluntary decision by Sinan himself. There is no evidence that Sinan was closely involved in the production of tiles and it's likely that he merely decided where tile decoration would be placed and made sure that the craftsmen were capable. Doğan Kuban also argues that while the vivid tiles inside the mihrab of the Rüstem Pasha Mosque could have symbolized an image of Paradise, tile decoration in Ottoman mosques did not generally have deeper symbolic meanings.

The tilework in the Rüstem Pasha Mosque also marks the beginning of the artistic peak of Iznik tile art from the 1560s onward. Blue colours predominate, but the important "tomato red" colour began to make an appearance. The repertoire of motifs includes tulips, hyacinths, carnations, roses, pomegranates, artichoke leaves, narcissus, and Chinese "cloud" motifs. Around 1560 the colour palette of Iznik tiles also shifted slightly. With the introduction of tomato red, which was perfected in the following years, some colours like turquoise and manganese purple stopped appearing, while a new shade of green also appeared. This shift is partly evident in the Rüstem Pasha Mosque and especially in the extensive tilework in the tomb of Haseki Hürrem (1558) and the tomb of Suleiman (1566), both located behind the Süleymaniye Mosque. The highest artistic form of Iznik tiles was achieved soon after this during the reign of Selim II, who succeeded his father Suleiman, and continued until the end of the century. Some of the most exceptional tilework examples from this period can be found in the Sokollu Mehmed Pasha Mosque, the Piyale Pasha Mosque (1574), the tomb of Selim II (1576), the small Takkeci İbrahim Ağa Mosque (1592), the tomb of Murad III (1595), and in some parts of the Topkapı Palace. The tilework panels in the Chamber of Murad III (1578) in Topkapı Palace and in the mihrab area of the Atik Valide Mosque (1583) in Üsküdar also show a trend of using colours in more abstract ways, such as the adding of red spots on flower petals of different colours, which is a detail particular to Ottoman art.

As noted by Arthur Lane in his seminal study of Iznik tiles published in 1957, the effect of Iznik tilework, when successfully employed in Ottoman domed interiors, results in a feeling of lightness and harmony, where the intricate details of the tiles themselves do not overwhelm the onlooker. Tile decoration in the provinces was typically of lesser quality to that found in the main imperial centers of patronage. However some wealthy local patrons probably imported tiles from Istanbul, which explains the high-quality tilework in some distant monuments such as the Behram Pasha Mosque (1572–73) in Diyarbakir.

Iznik tilework in the second half of the 16th century

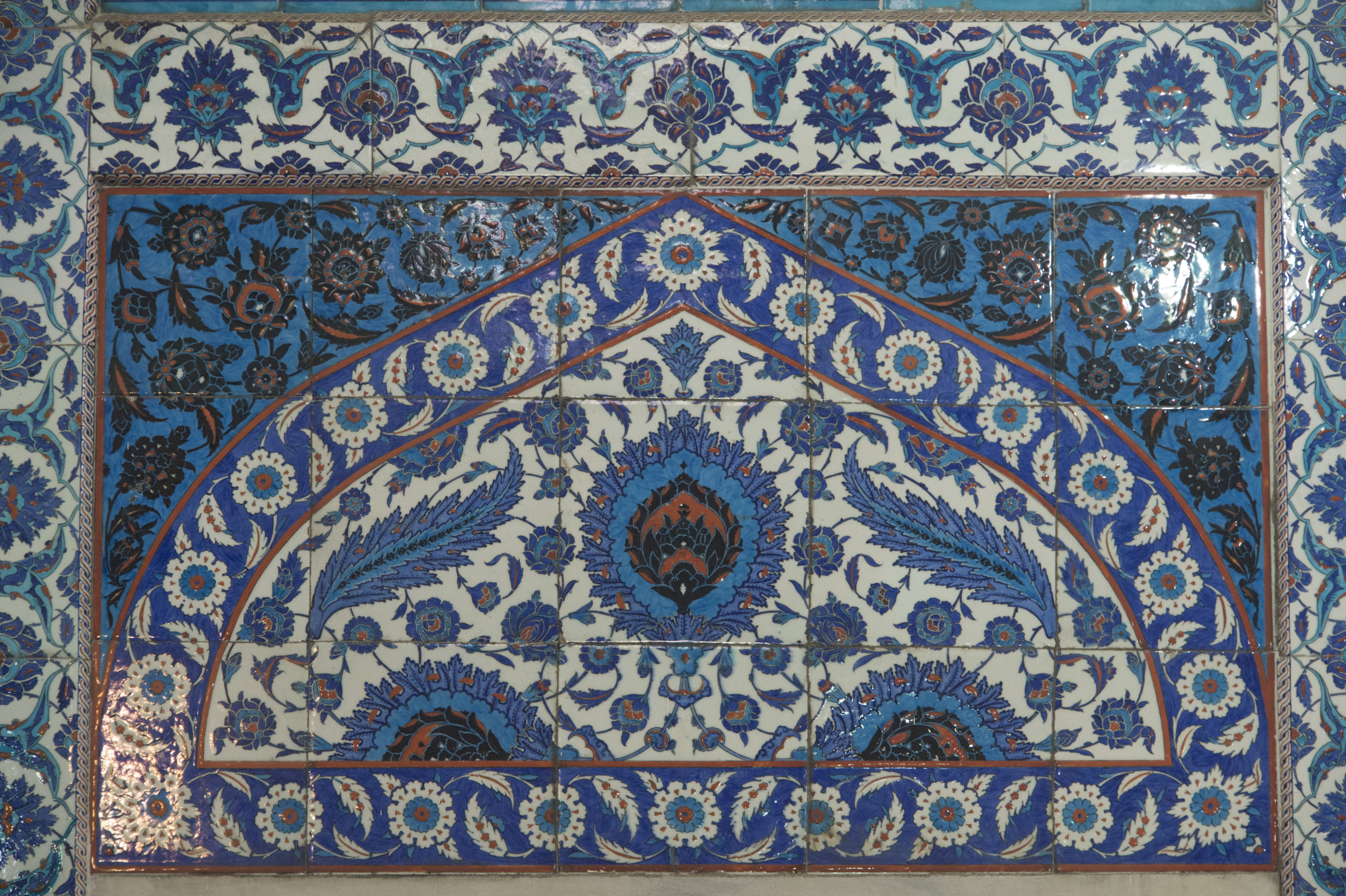
Tiles in the Tomb of Roxelana, Istanbul (1558)

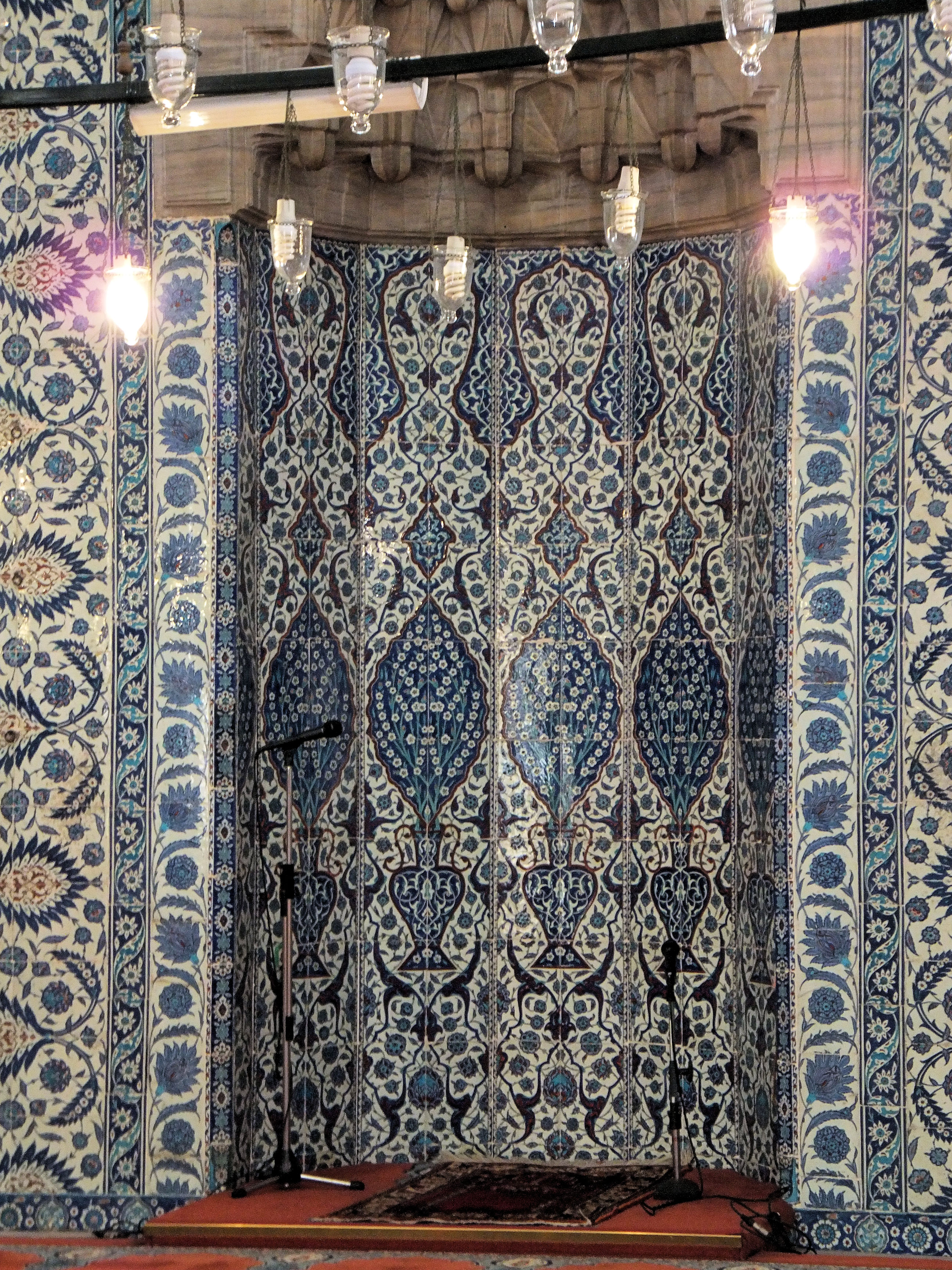
Tiles in the mihrab of the Rüstem Pasha Mosque, Istanbul (circa 1561)

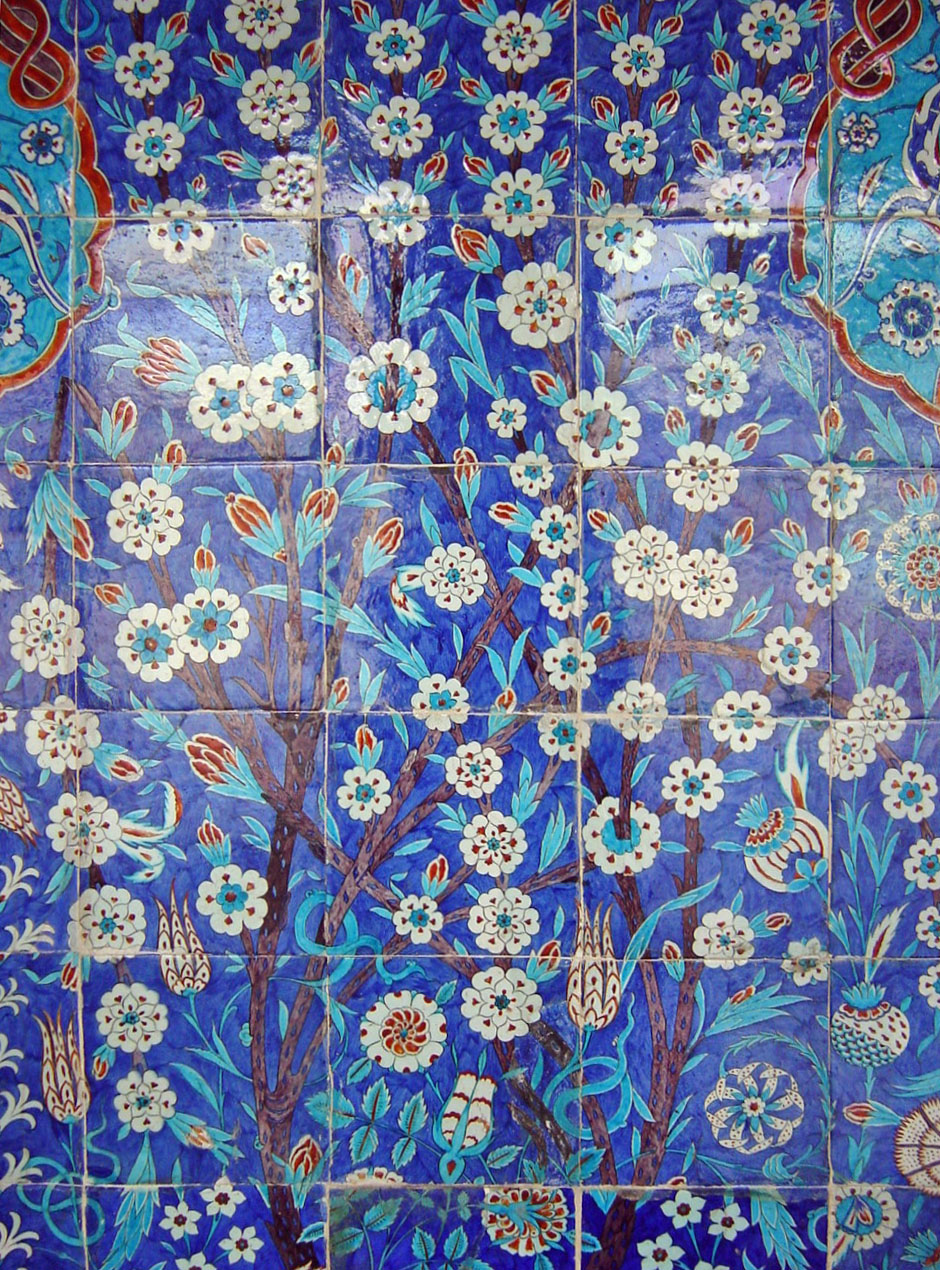
Tiles in the outer portico of the Rüstem Pasha Mosque, Istanbul (circa 1561)

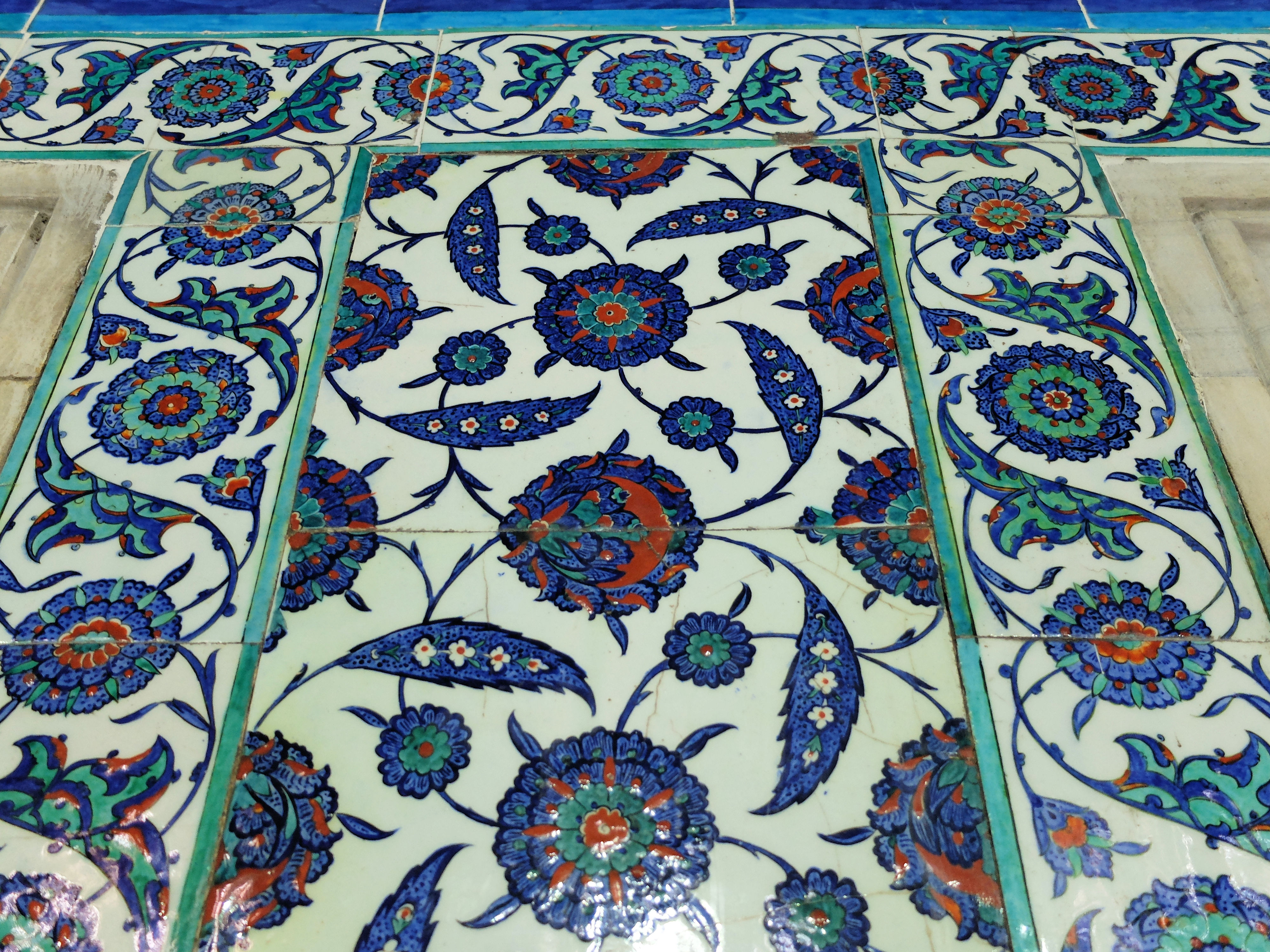
TIles in the Mausoleum of Suleiman, Istanbul (1566)

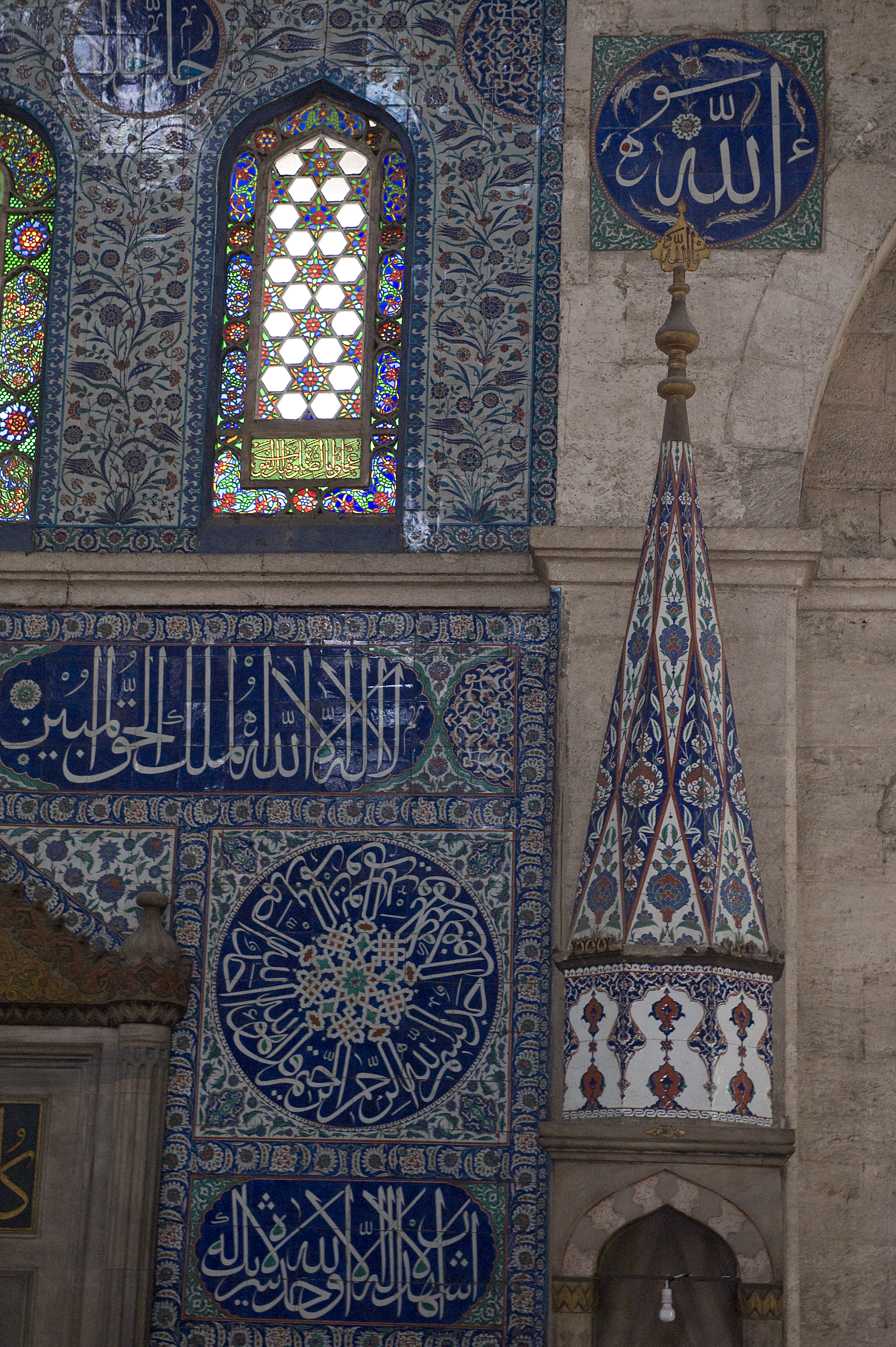
Tile decoration in the Sokollu Mehmed Pasha Mosque, Istanbul (1572)

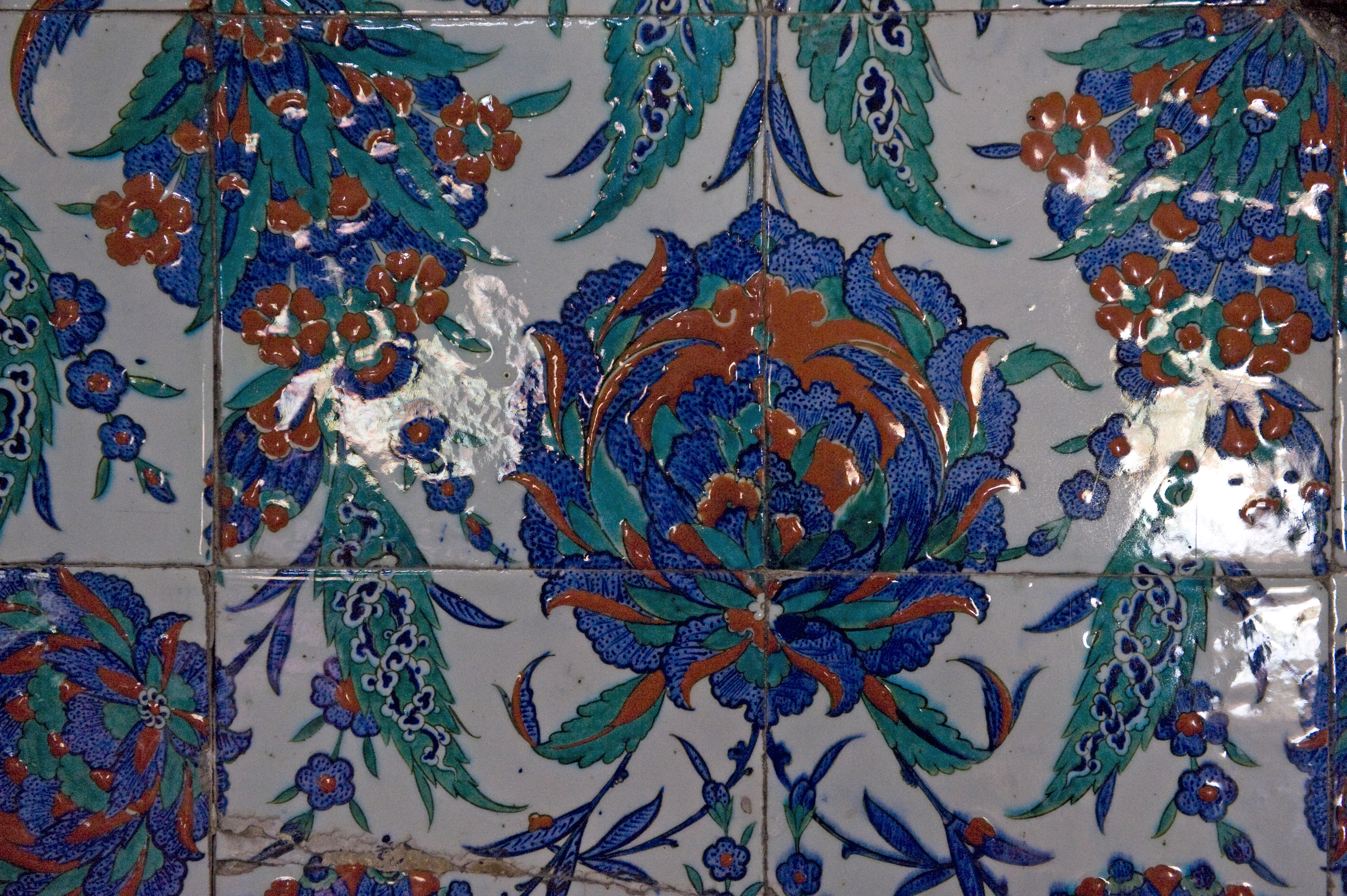
Detail of tiles in the Sokollu Mehmed Pasha Mosque, Istanbul (1572)

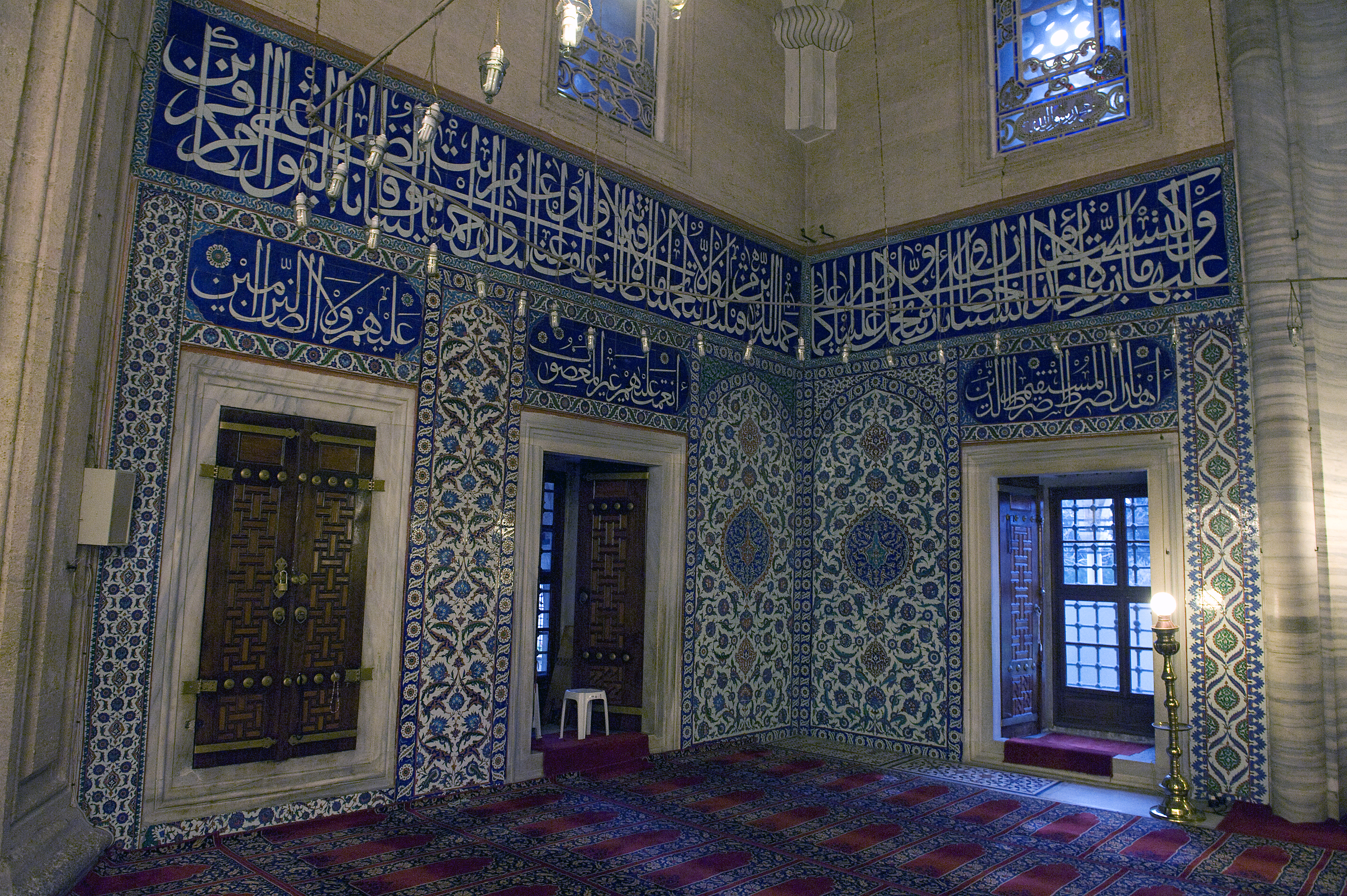
Tilework near the mihrab in the Selimiye Mosque, Edirne (circa 1574)

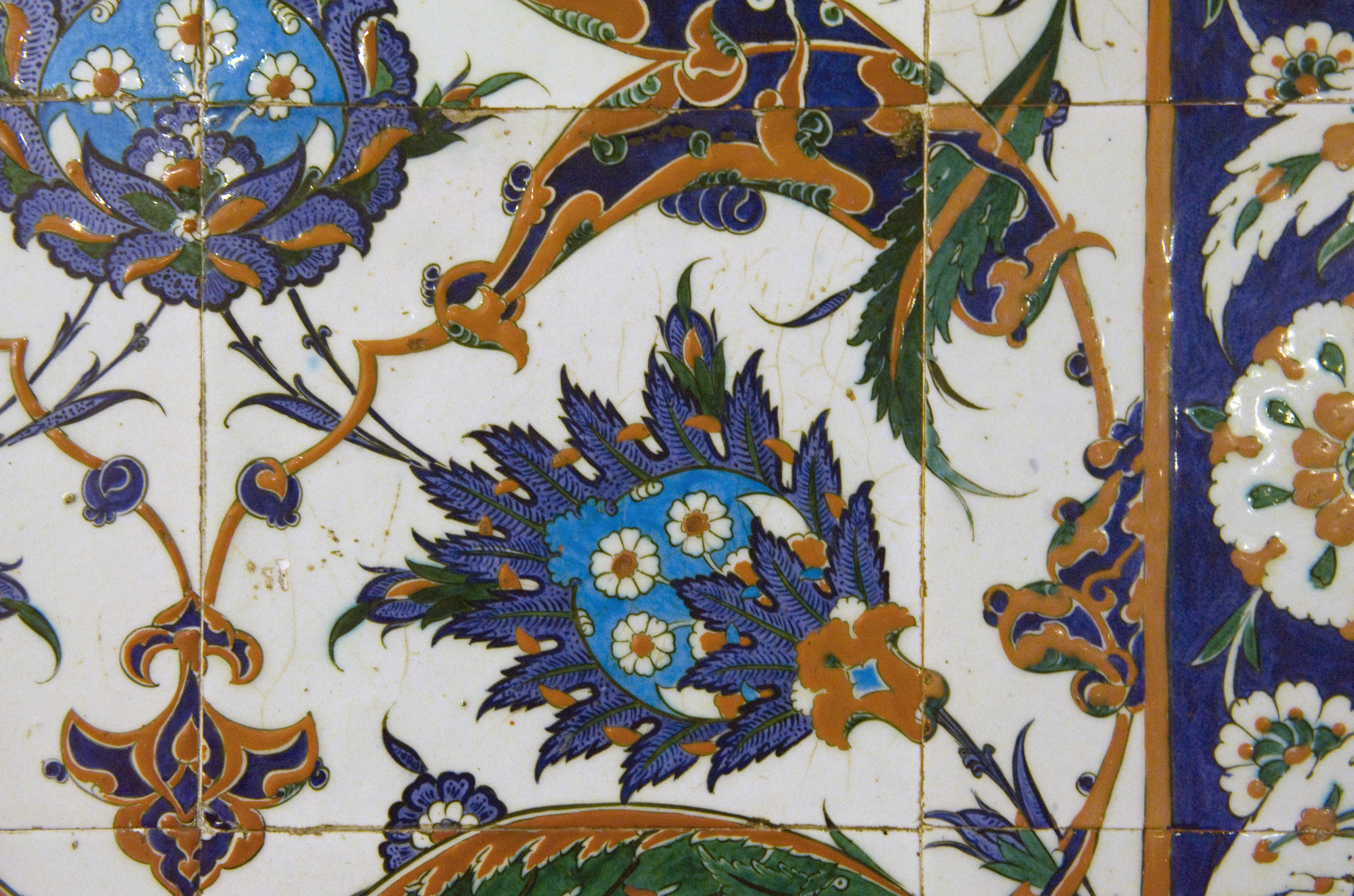
Detail of tiles in the Selimiye Mosque, Edirne (circa 1574)

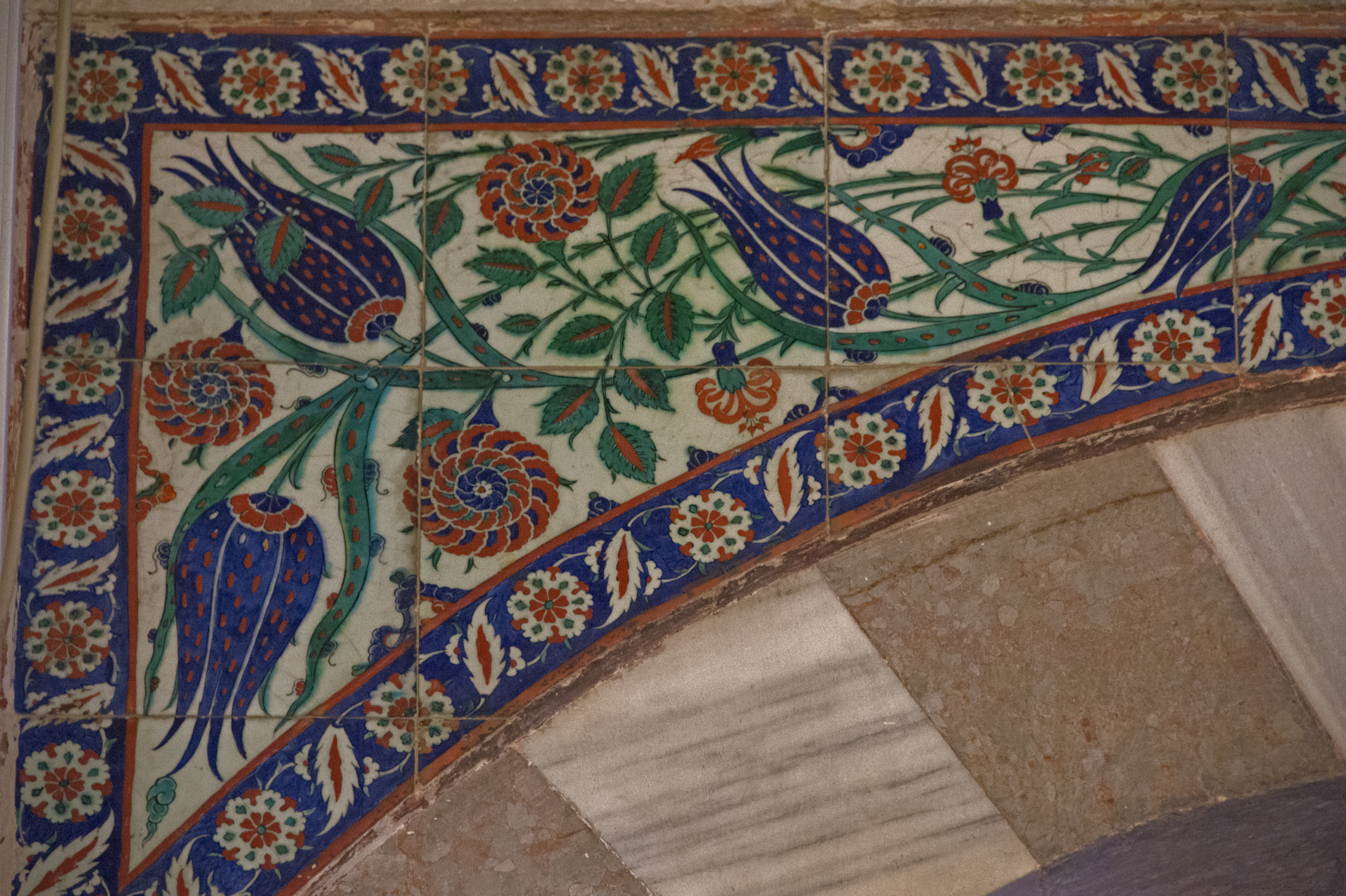
Detail of tiles in the Selimiye Mosque, Edirne (circa 1574)

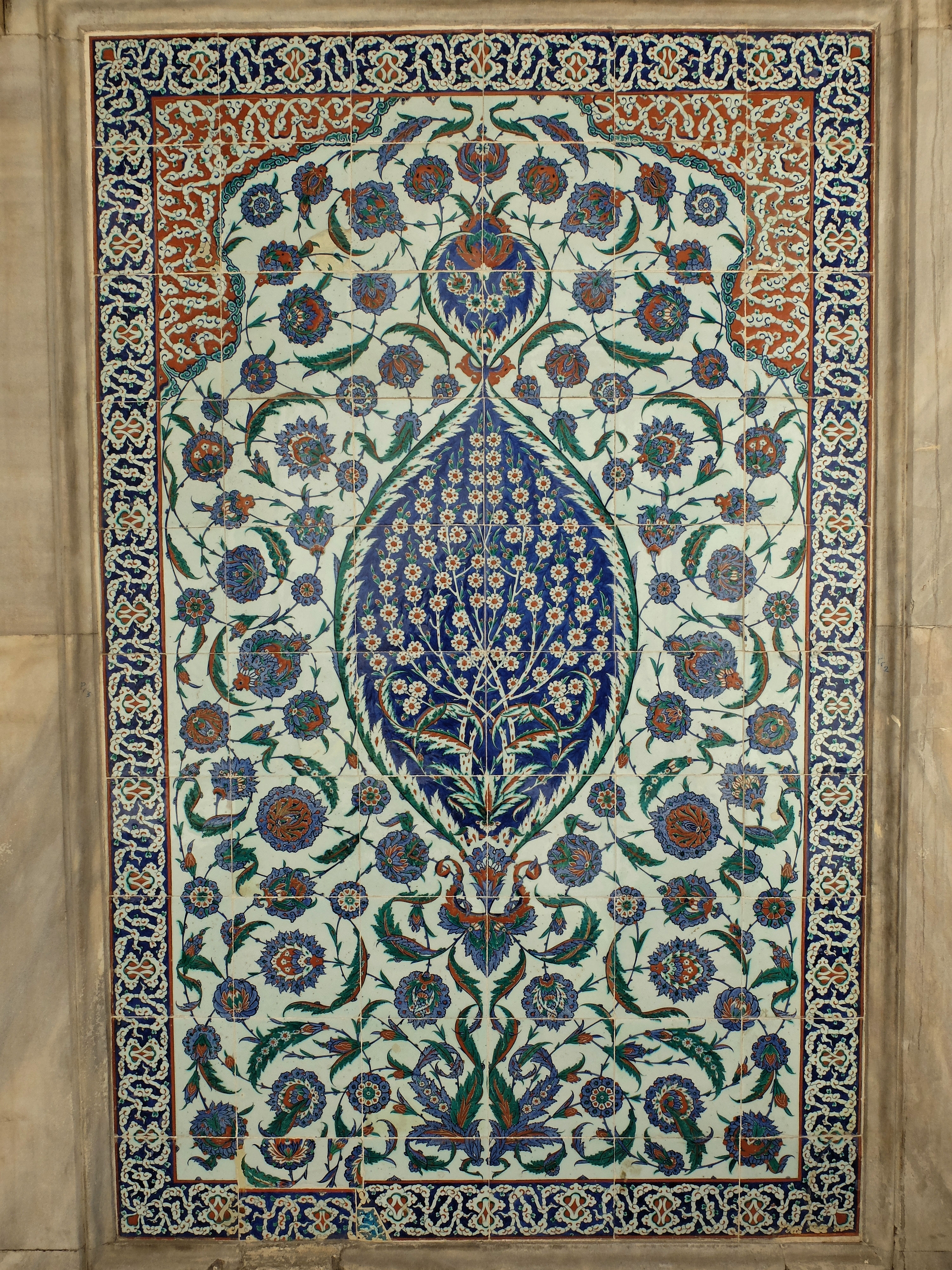
Tile panel at the entrance to the Tomb of Selim II in Istanbul (1576)

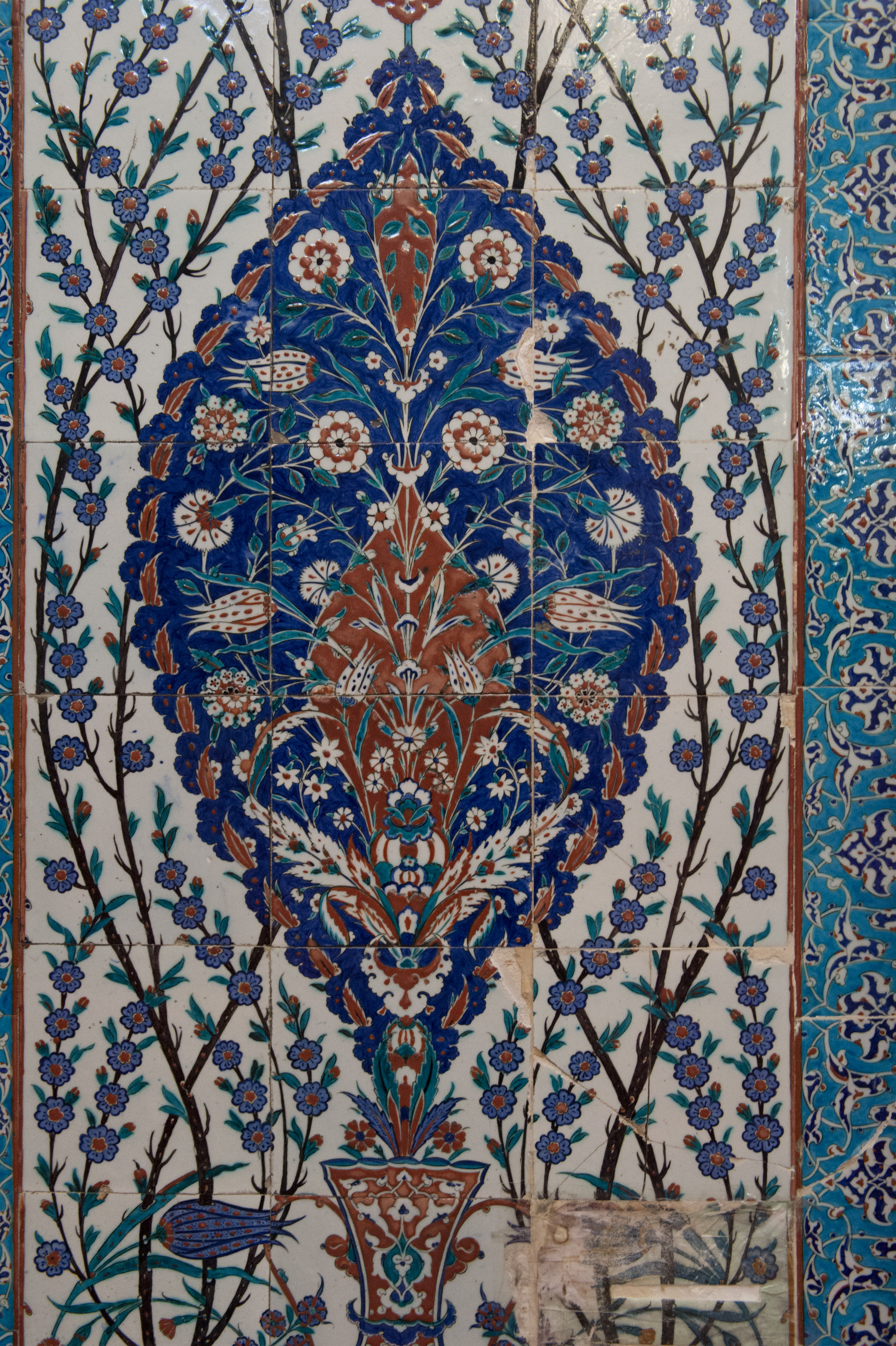
Tiles in the Atik Valide Mosque, Istanbul (1583)

In the early 17th century, some features of 16th-century Iznik tiles began to fade, such as the use of embossed tomato red. At the same time, some motifs became more rigidly geometric and stylized. The enormous Sultan Ahmed Mosque (or "Blue Mosque"), begun in 1609 and inaugurated in 1617, contains the richest collection of tilework of any Ottoman mosque. According to official Ottoman documents it contained as many as 20,000 tiles. The dominant colours are blue and green, while the motifs are typical of the 17th century: tulips, carnations, cypresses, roses, vines, flower vases, and Chinese cloud motifs. The best tiles in the mosque, located on the back wall on the balcony level, were originally made for the Topkapı Palace in the late 16th century and were reused here. The massive undertaking of decorating such a large building strained the tile industry in Iznik and some of the tilework is repetitive and inconsistent in its quality. The much smaller Çinili ("Tiled") Mosque (1640) in Üsküdar is also covered in tilework on the inside. The most harmonious examples of tile decoration in 17th-century Ottoman architecture are the Yerevan Kiosk and Baghdad Kiosk in Topkapı Palace, built in 1635 and 1639, respectively. Both their exterior and interior walls are covered in tiles. Some of the tiles are cuerda seca tiles of a much earlier period, reused from elsewhere, but most are blue-and-white tiles that imitate early 16th-century Iznik work.

While the craftsmen at Iznik were still capable of producing rich and colourful tiles throughout the 17th century, there was an overall decline in quality. This was a result of a decline in imperial commissions, as fewer major building projects were sponsored by ruling elites during this period. The Celali revolts in the early 17th century also had a significant impact, as Evliya Çelebi records that the number of tile workshops in Iznik during this time dropped from 900 to only 9. Some of the production continued in the city of Kütahya instead of Iznik. Kütahya, unlike Iznik, had not become solely reliant on imperial commissions and as a result it weathered the changes more successfully. Many of its artisans were Armenians who continued to produce tiles for churches and other buildings.

Tile manufacture declined further in the second half of the century. Nonetheless, the interior of the "New Mosque" or Yeni Cami in the Eminönü neighbourhood, completed in 1663, is a late example of lavish Iznik tile decoration in an imperial mosque. The finest tiles in the complex are reserved for the sultan's private gallery and lounge (the Hünkâr Kasrı). By this period, blue and turquoise colours increasingly predominated, and many commissioned works limited their patterns to single tiles instead of creating larger patterns across multiple tiles. Tiles like this were imported in significant quantities to Egypt around this time, as can be seen in the Aqsunqur Mosque (otherwise known as the "Blue Mosque") in Cairo, which was renovated in 1652 by Ibrahim Agha, a local Janissary commander.

Iznik tiles in the 17th century

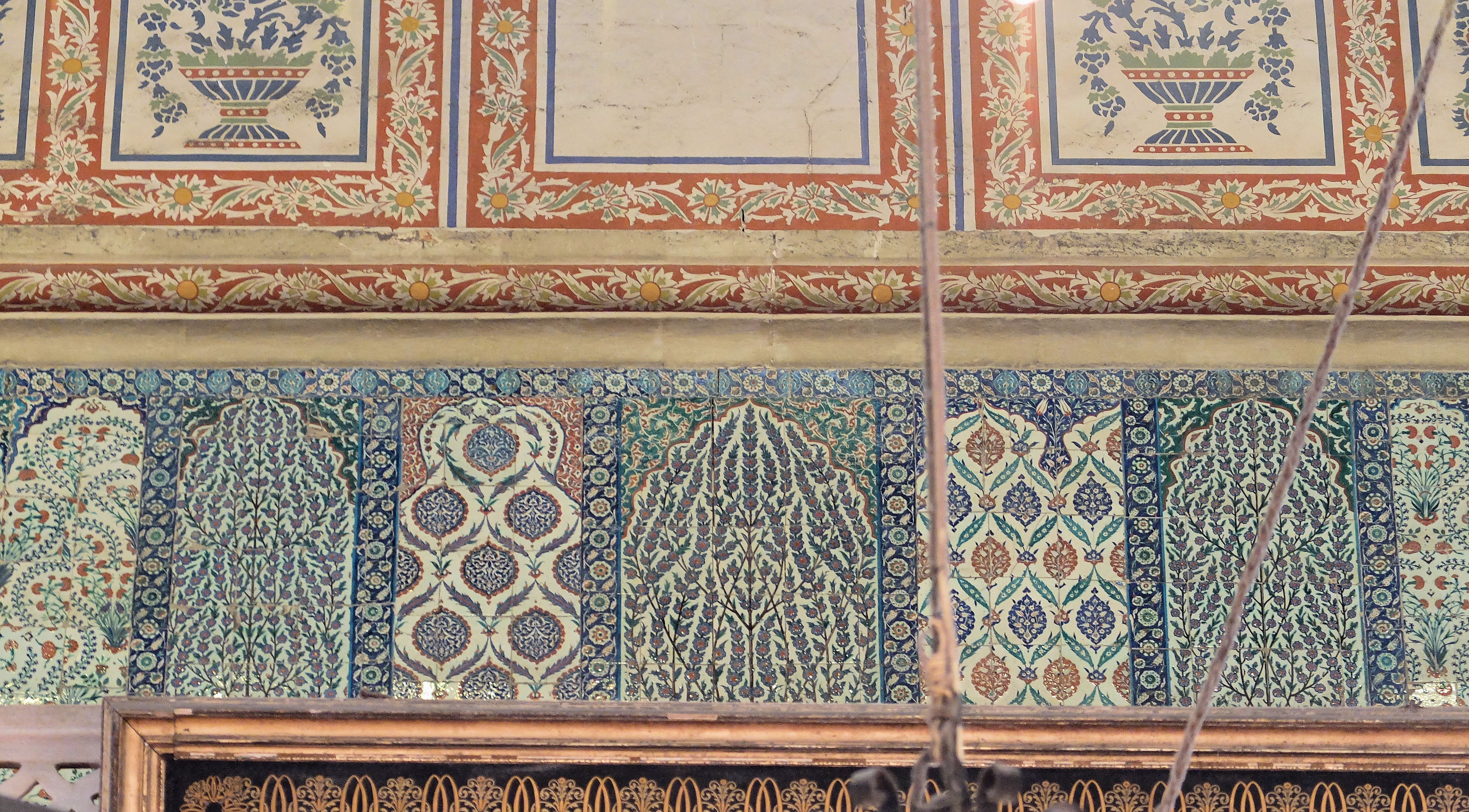
Tiles (with painted decoration above) on the back wall of the Sultan Ahmed I Mosque, Istanbul (circa 1617)

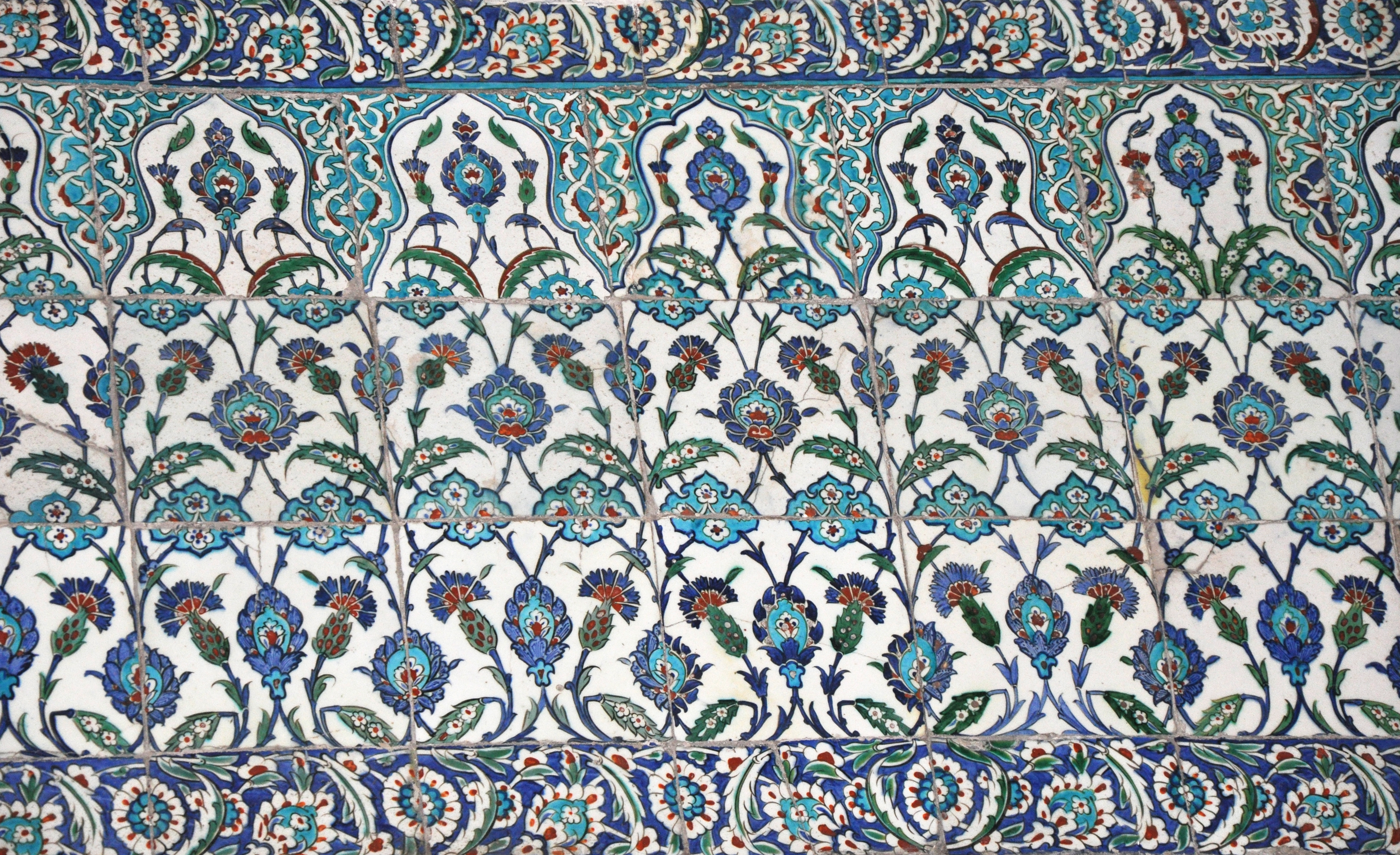
Detail of tiles in the Sultan Ahmed I Mosque, Istanbul (circa 1617)

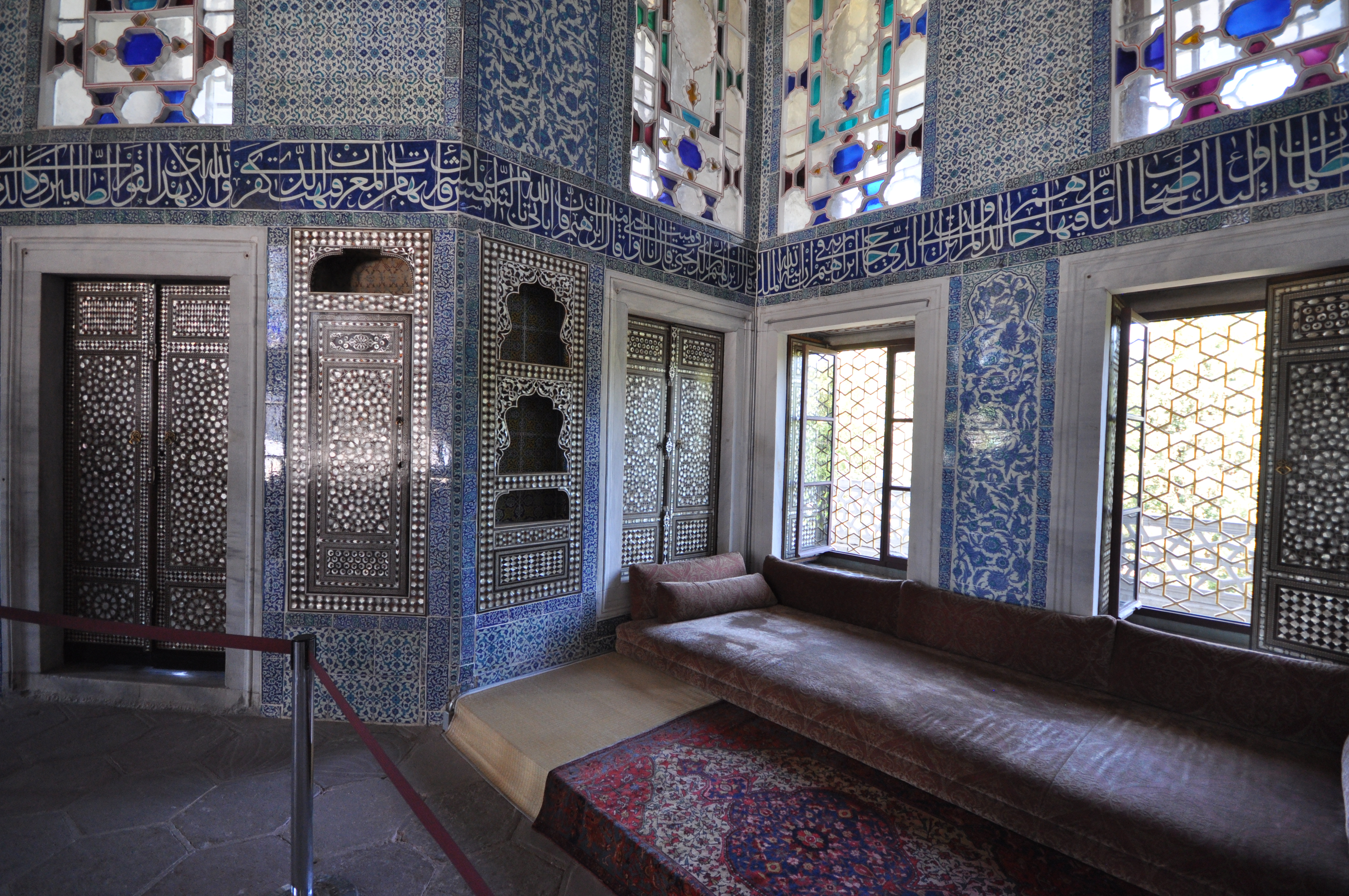
Tiled interior of the Baghdad Kiosk in Topkapı Palace (1639)

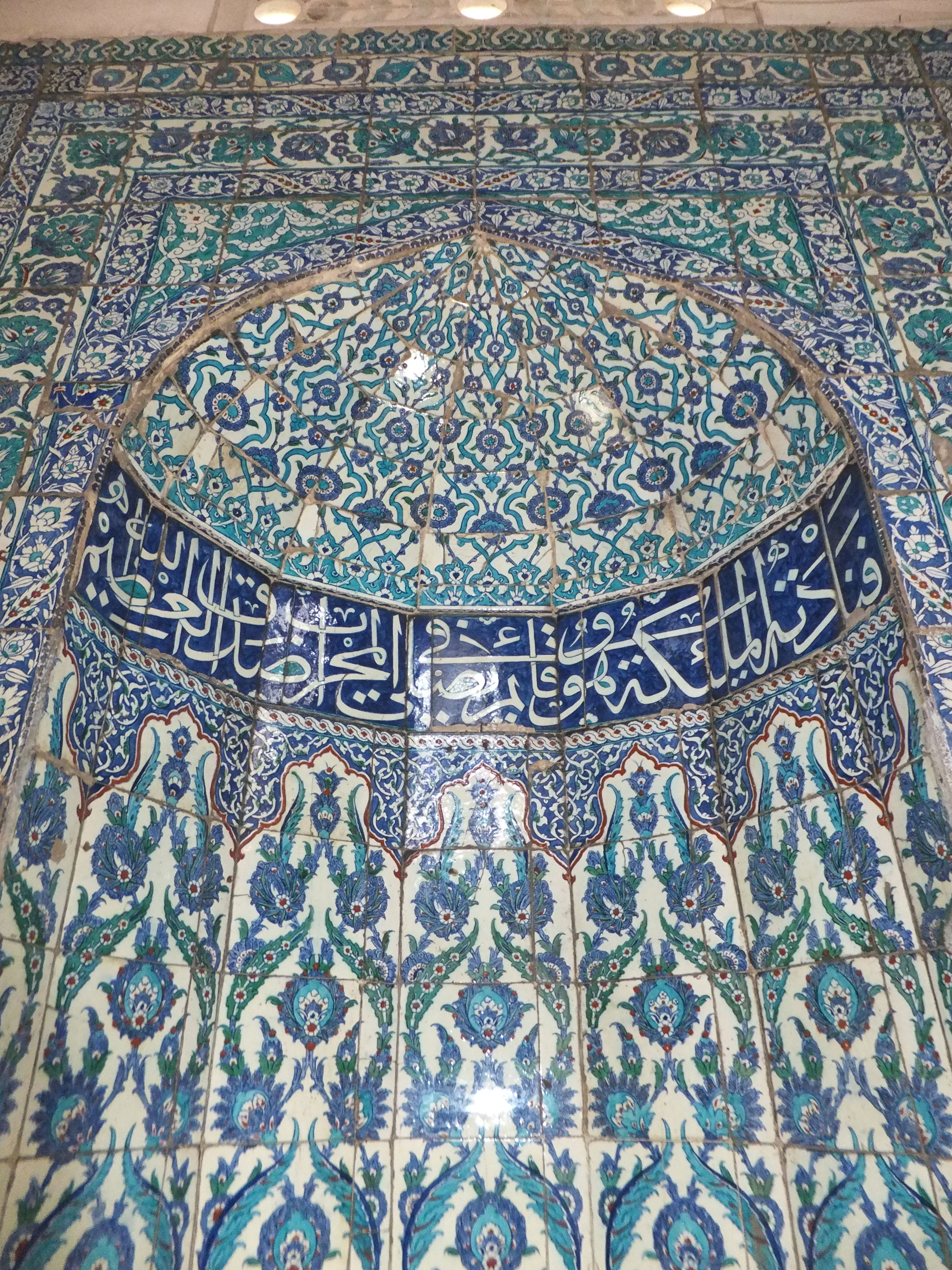
Tiled mihrab of the Çinili Mosque (1640)

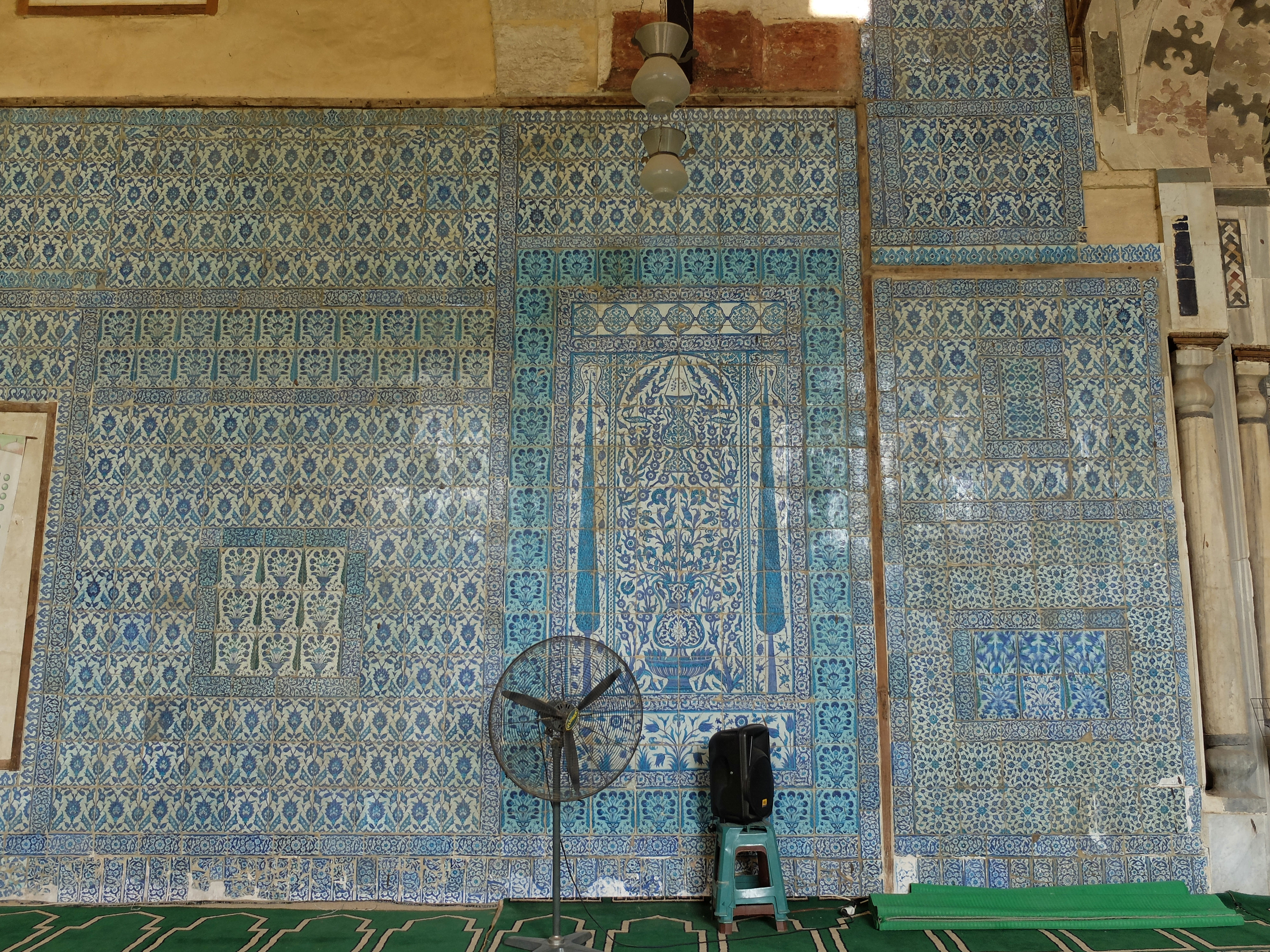
Iznik tiles in the Aqsunqur Mosque in Cairo, Egypt (1652)

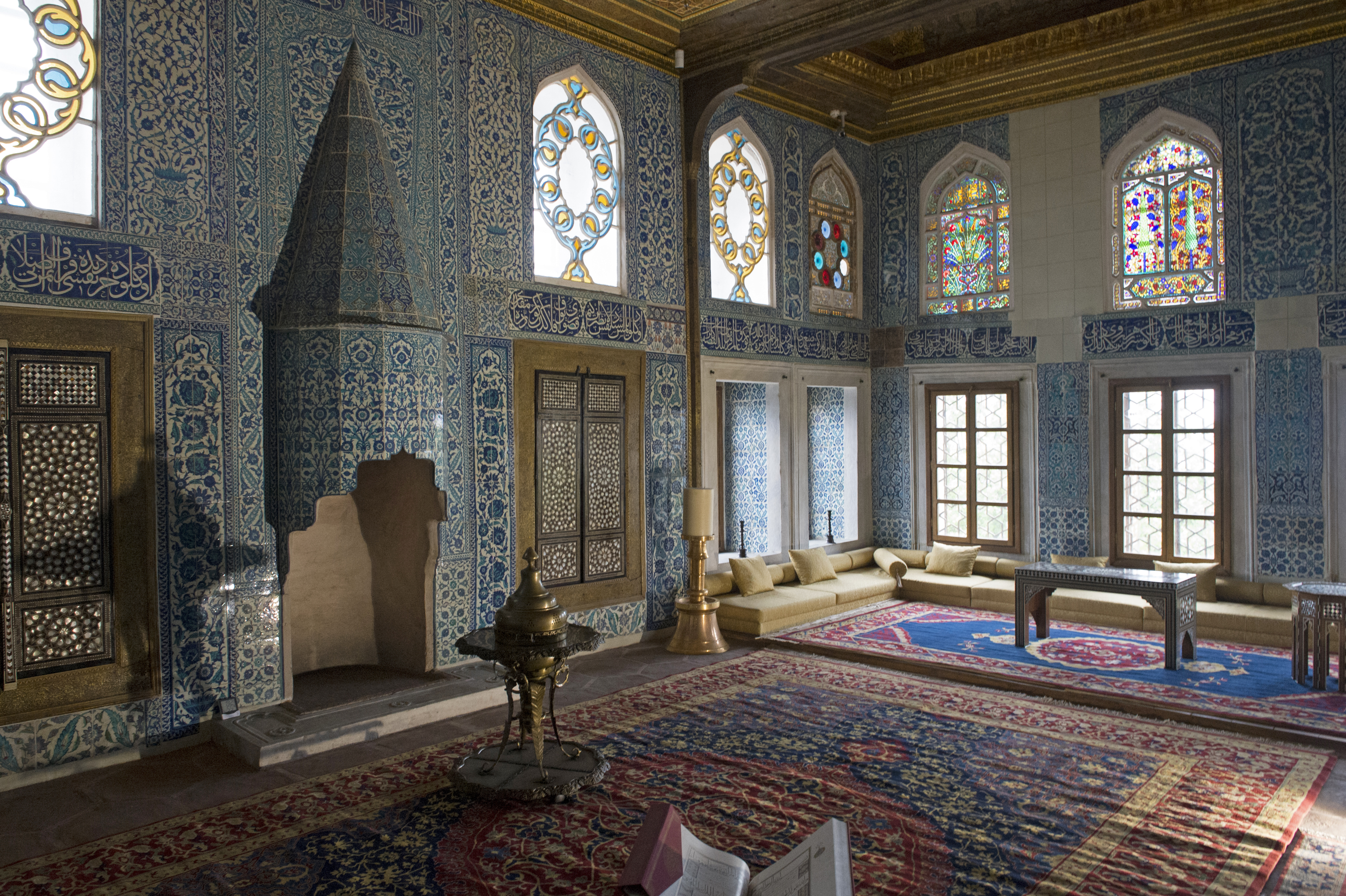
The tiled interior of the Hünkâr Kasrı (sultan's pavilion) at the New Mosque, Istanbul (circa 1663)

=== Tekfursaray, Kütahya, and late period tiles ===
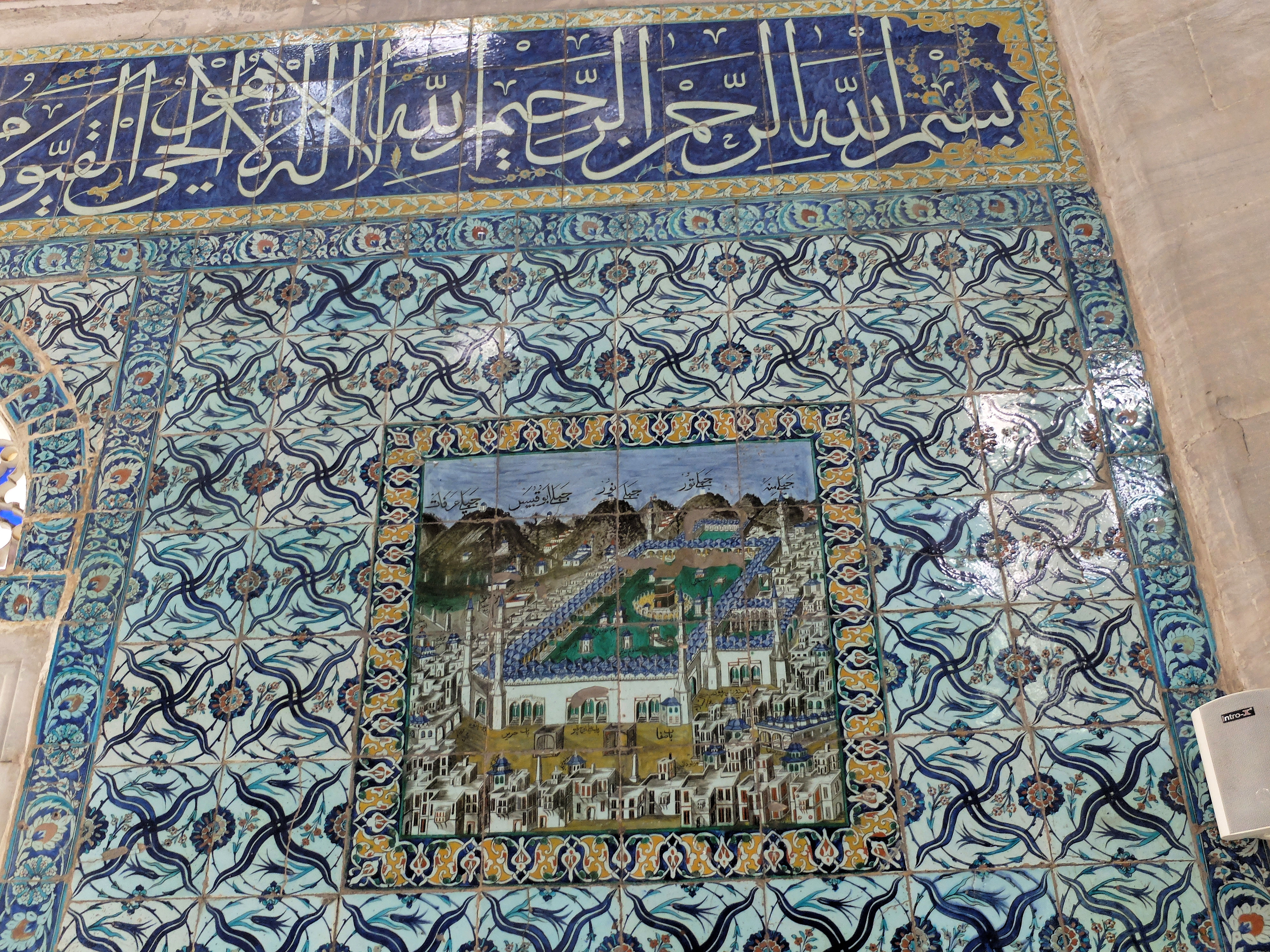
Tekfursaray tiles in the Hekimoğlu Ali Paşa Mosque (1734), including a depiction of the Great Mosque of Mecca

Tile production in Iznik came to an end in the 18th century. Ahmet III and his grand vizier attempted to revive the tile industry by establishing a new workshop between 1719 and 1724 at Tekfursaray in Istanbul, where a previous workshop had existed in the early 16th century. Production continued here for a while but the tiles from this period are not comparable to earlier Iznik tiles. Pottery production also continued and even increased at Kütahya, where new styles developed alongside imitations of older classical Ottoman designs. The colours of tiles in this period were mostly turquoise and dark cobalt blue, while a brownish-red, yellow, and a deep green also appearing. The background was often discoloured, colours often ran together slightly, and the patterns were again typically limited to single tiles. The earliest recorded Tekfursaray tiles are those made in 1724–1725 for the mihrab of the older Cezeri Kasım Pasha Mosque (1515) in Eyüp, Istanbul. Tekfursaray tiles are also found in the Hekimoğlu Ali Pasha Mosque (1734), on the Ahmed III Fountain (1729) near Hagia Sophia, and in some of the rooms and corridors of the Harem section in Topkapı Palace. Kütahya tiles are present in Istanbul in the Yeni Valide Mosque in Üsküdar (1708–1711), the Beylerbeyi Mosque (1777–1778), and arts of Topkapı Palace, and well as in mosques in other cities like Konya and Antalya.

The Kütahya and Tekfursary kilns notably produced a number of tiles and groups of tiles that were painted with illustrations of the Great Mosque of Mecca. These appear in multiple buildings the 18th century, but some examples of this appeared even earlier in Iznik tiles from the late 17th century. Earlier examples show the Kaaba and the surrounding colonnades of the mosque in a more abstract style. Later examples in the 18th century, influenced by European art, employ perspective in depicting the mosque and they sometimes depict the entire city of Mecca. Depictions of Medina and the Prophet's Mosque also appear in other specimens of the time. Examples of these pictorial tile paintings can be seen in the collections of several museums as well as inside some mosques (e.g. the Hekimoğlu Ali Pasha Mosque) and in several rooms at Topkapı Palace, such as the tiles adorning the mihrab of the prayer room of the Black Eunuchs.

After the Patrona Halil rebellion in 1730, which deposed Ahmet III and executed his grand vizier, the Tekfursaray kilns were left without a patron and quickly ceased to function. The shortage of quality tiles in the 18th century also caused Iznik tiles from older buildings to be reused and moved to new ones on multiple occasions. For example, when repairs were being done at Topkapı Palace in 1738 old tiles had to be removed from the Edirne Palace and shipped to Istanbul instead. Ultimately, tilework decoration in Ottoman architecture lost its significance during the 18th century.

Kütahya nonetheless did continue to produce decorative tiles up to the 19th century, though the quality deteriorated in the late 18th century. Some of the potters in the city were Armenian Christians and some of the tiles were commissioned for Armenian churches. Christian tile decoration of this period often depicted saints, angels, the Virgin Mary, and biblical scenes. Examples can be found at the Krikor Lusaroviç Church in Tophane, Istanbul, and the Surp Astvazazin Church in Ankara, among others. Some of the tiles were exported further abroad and examples of them have been found in Jerusalem, Cairo, and Venice.

A moderately successful effort to revive Ottoman tile production occurred under Abdülhamid II in the late 19th and early 20th centuries, partly under the influence of the First National Architectural Movement. This period saw tiles produced for several new mosques, schools, and government buildings. These workshops eventually closed down after the First World War.

== Painted decoration ==
Painting was an essential part of the decoration of Ottoman buildings and it covered interior walls, ceilings, and the inside of domes. However, it has been relatively neglected in studies of Ottoman architecture, probably in part because very little original Ottoman painted decoration has been preserved to the present day, as much of it was redone or replaced in more recent periods.

Paint, as well as gold leaf, was applied on a variety of mediums including plaster, wood, leather or cloth, and stone. For plaster decoration, there were generally two types: kalemişi and malakâri. The first refers to paint being applied directly to plaster, while the second referred to applying paint onto relief decoration sculpted beforehand. (Note: Kalemişi is named after the brush used for painting, the kalem, while malakâri is named after the trowel used for sculpting plaster, the mala.) The design of the ornamentation was often stenciled onto the plaster first, using paper pierced with pin holes in the shape of the motifs, over which coal dust was rubbed to leave outlines on the walls that were then painted.

The motifs of this decoration were typically similar to the motifs used in other contemporary arts, such as manuscript illumination. The painters, who came from many different ethnic and religious backgrounds, were either independent artists or artisans already employed by the imperial palace, hired specifically to decorate the building. The patrons who commissioned the buildings may have laid down certain parameters or instructions for the decorators, such as requesting inscriptions that highlighted their social status or a political message.

=== Early trends ===
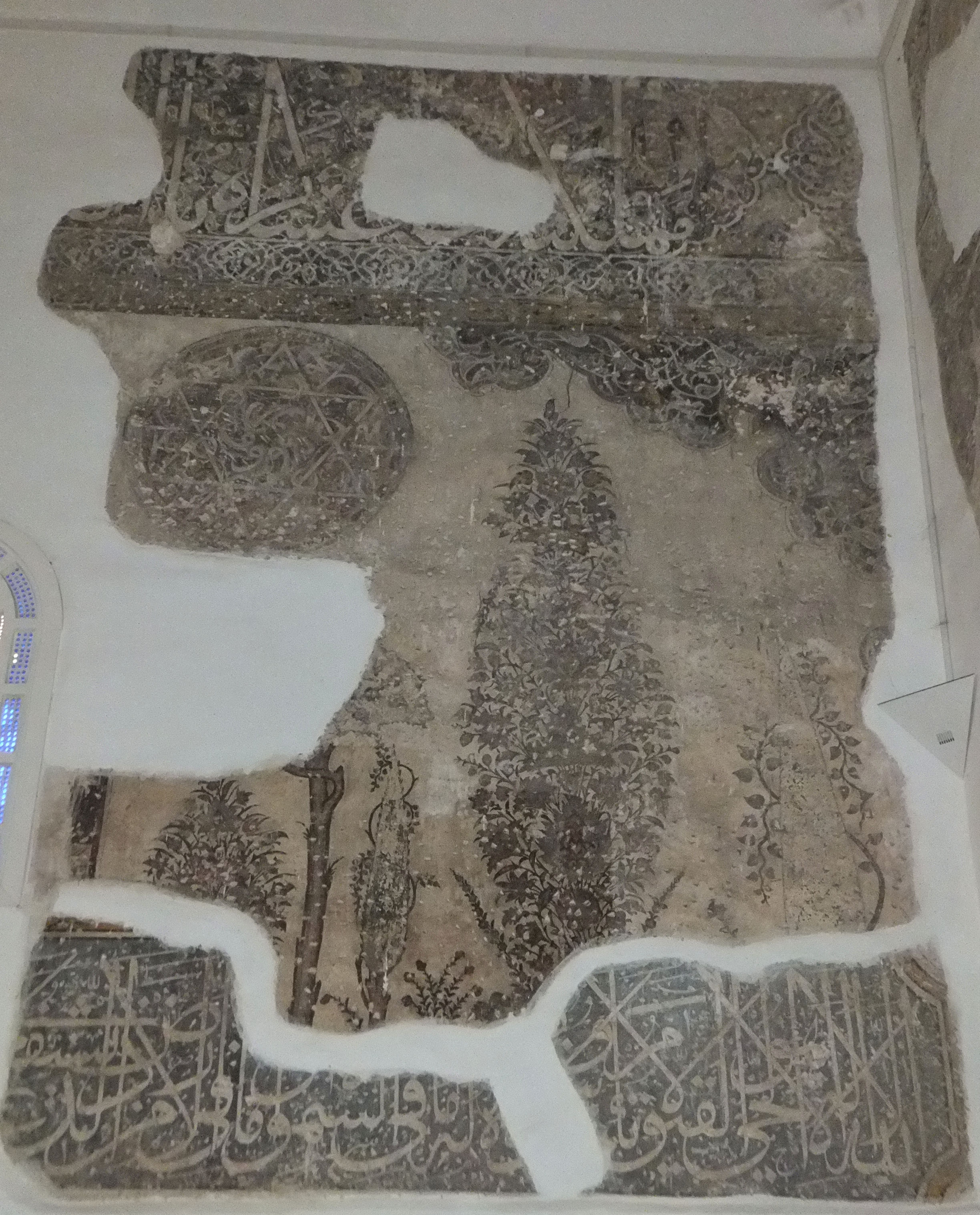
Partially preserved mural decoration inside the Murad II Mosque in Edirne, circa 1436

Early examples indicate that Ottoman decoration developed a preference for floriate motifs. One such motif that was popular throughout the history of Ottoman art is the rumî style, (Note: The style is most likely named after Anatolia, which was known previously to Muslims as Rum or the "land of Rome", referring to the Eastern Roman Empire.) which consists of scrolling, spiraling, and/or intertwining stems with stylized leaves. This style was already in use in Anatolia in Seljuk art and in Byzantine art. The earliest Ottoman example may be the partly-preserved painted decoration that can still be seen around a window in the Kirgizlar Mausoleum in Iznik, which is dated to the reign of Orhan (r. 1324–1360).

Early Ottoman decorative motifs remained similar to those found in earlier Anatolian Seljuk architecture and in neighboring Islamic cultures, as attested by a few surviving examples from the 15th century. One of the most important examples is the partially-preserved mural decoration inside the Murad II Mosque in Edirne, which still dates back to its construction circa 1436. The ornamentation inside the southeastern (qibla) iwan depicts natural landscapes with stylized flowers and trees that appear to reflect the same artistic styles used in book illustrations and miniatures, particularly those from the Timurid Empire further east. Painted decoration of a similar style is also found in the Mausoleum of Cem Sultan in the Muradiye complex in Bursa, dating from the late 15th century. There the motifs are more abstract and predominantly feature stylized vases of flowers, alongside calligraphic compositions, all rendered in highly vivid colours.

Another floriate style that appeared in Ottoman decoration from the 15th century onward is hatayî, (Note: Named after Hatay or Hitay, the name by which Eastern Turkestan and China were known.) which consists in large part of peonies and leaves shown in varying stages of budding and blooming. This style had its origins further east in China or Turkestan and it appeared in Islamic art from the 13th century onward.

=== 16th-century developments ===
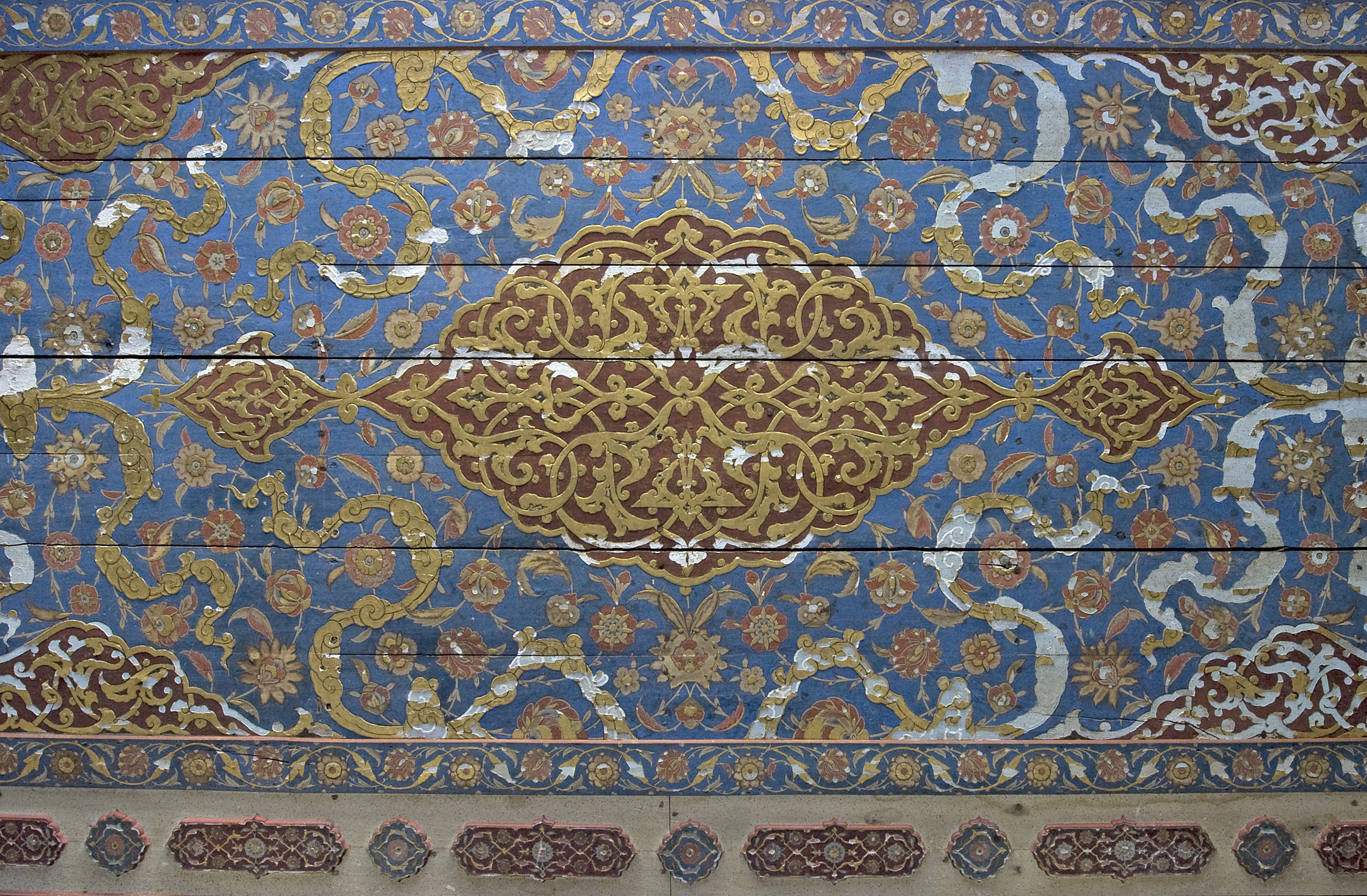
A painted wooden ceiling under the gallery of the Kara Ahmed Pasha Mosque in Istanbul, circa 1554. This mixes a number of design elements including a central medallion, saz-style motifs, and "Chinese clouds".

In the early 16th century, the range of decorative motifs in Ottoman art expanded, as attested in other mediums of Ottoman art such as tiles and manuscript decoration. Only a few fragments of painted ornament have survived in architecture from this era, but a similar trend most likely occurred in this medium as well. New elements included a Chinese-inspired "cloud" motif, which took a form of curving or scrolling cloud ribbons, also apparent on contemporary tilework.

In the second quarter of the century, the saz style (also mentioned above for tile decoration) was developed by Ottoman artist Şahkulu. It was derived from the hatayî style and added new motifs, most notably large serrated leaves. It was less formal and geometrically rigid, allowing these motifs to be combined and arranged in a wide variety of ways to fill any space. One of the finest examples of this style surviving from the 16th century is found in the Kılıç Ali Pasha Mosque (circa 1581), where it is painted on oil cloth stretched over the lower part of the wooden muezzin's gallery.

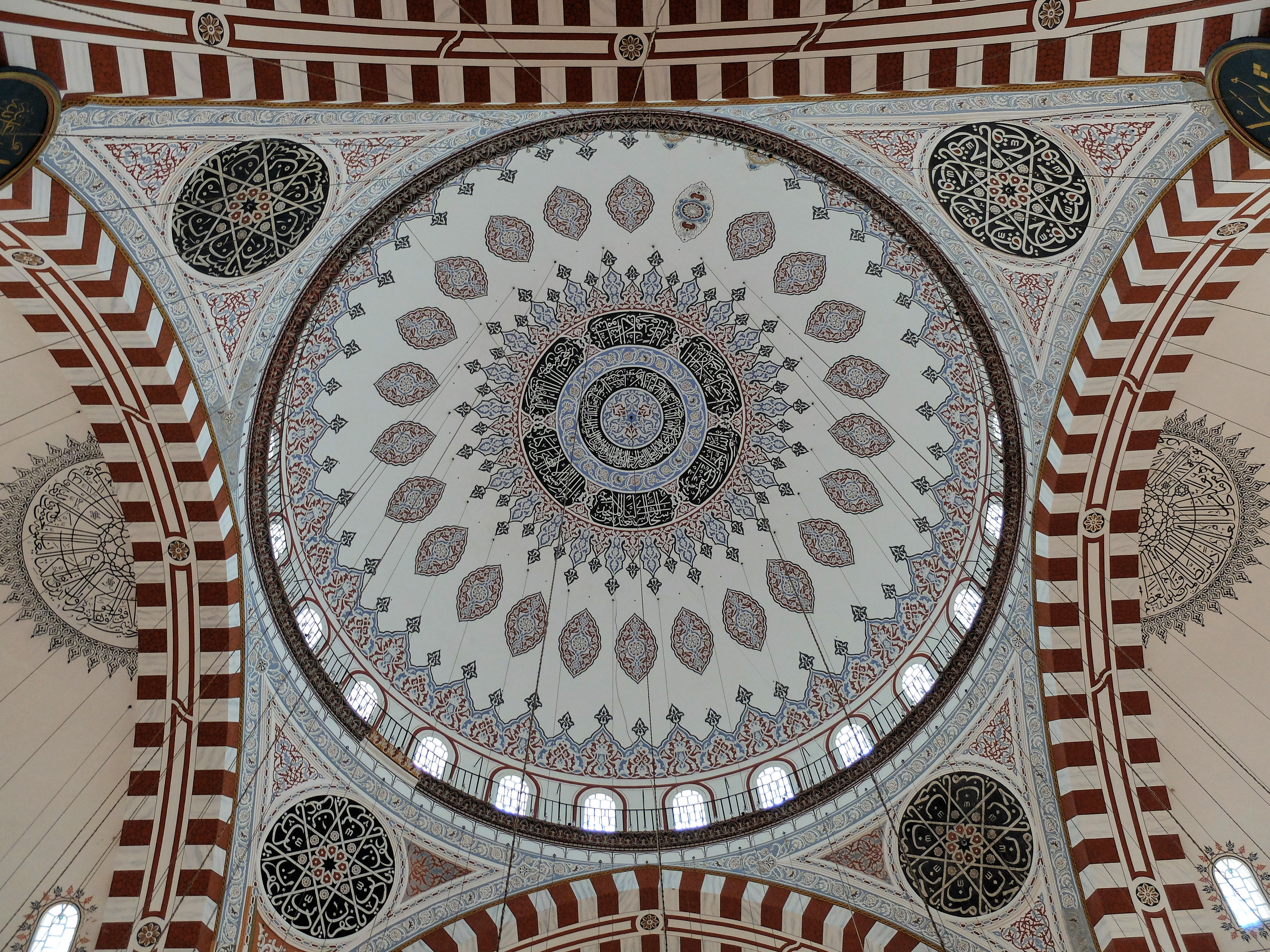
Painted dome of the Şehzade Mosque (16th century), (Note: The original 16th-century decoration of the mosque was covered during later restorations by new layers of painted decoration reflecting the style of the Baroque and subsequent periods. The current appearance is the result of a 1990 restoration, when an attempt was made to restore original decoration that was partially uncovered beneath the later layers.) with central medallion design featuring calligraphy and vegetal motifs, along with four calligraphic roundels on the pendentives

The most monumental painted compositions were employed in and around the domes and semi-domes of Ottoman buildings. For much of the Ottoman era, domes were typically decorated with a circular medallion-like composition at the center of the dome that was filled with a calligraphic rendition of Qur'anic verses. The motif of the central medallion radiated outward to cover the rest of the dome, with the details filled by rumî, hatayî, or saz motifs. This type of dome decoration is well known from the 16th century onward but it probably had appeared earlier in the 15th century as well. The verses written in the central medallion were often selected from the an-Nur ("Light") chapter of the Qur'an and may have symbolically imparted a celestial or heavenly connotation to Ottoman domes. Another common element of decoration in this context is the painting of circular calligraphic medallions on the pendentives or on the spandrels of arches that support the dome. These calligraphic compositions featured the various epithets of God in Islam or the names of figures such as Muhammad and the Rashidun Caliphs. For monumental calligraphic inscriptions, a thuluth script was generally favored.

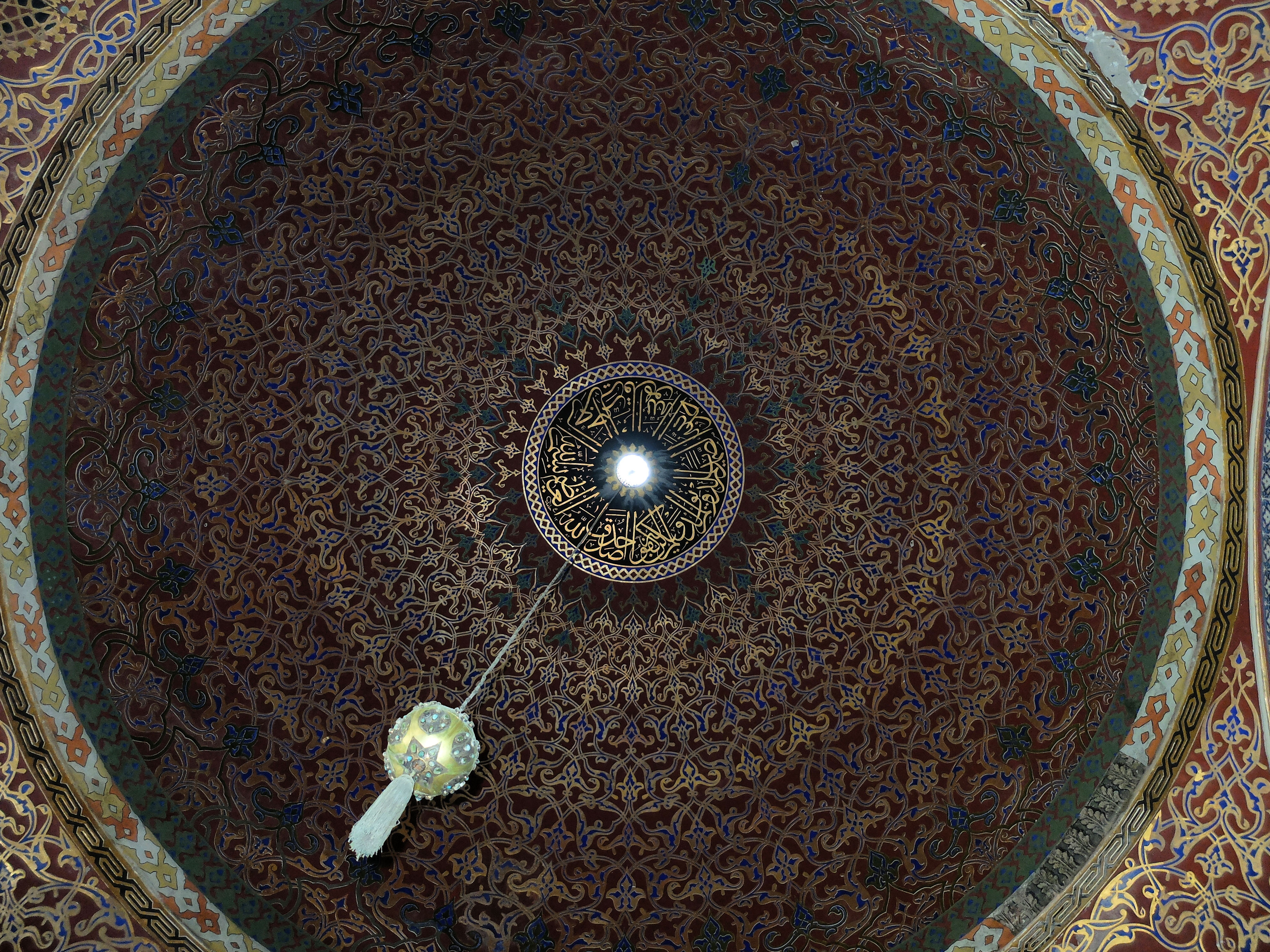
Painted dome of the Chamber of Murad III in Topkapı Palace, circa 1578, with rumî scrollwork radiating from the center of the dome

Other types of motifs were also used to cover the inside of domes, such as bands of rumî motifs radiating from the center or other types of rumî scrollwork. A well-preserved example of the latter is found in the dome of the Chamber of Murad III in Topkapı Palace (circa 1578), consisting of gold rumî scrollwork over a red background. The painted decoration is enhanced with pieces of rock crystal set into the dome that were likely meant to emulate stars. This latter detail is something also found inside the dome of Süleyman's mausoleum in Istanbul. The intrados of large supporting arches below the domes, as well as other supporting elements like consoles, were also covered in a variety of painted interlacing motifs.

The şukûfe style – developed by the successor of Şahkulu, Kara Memi – consists of depictions of garden flowers such as tulips, carnations, and hyacinths. Unlike the other styles mentioned above, it was rarely employed on a large scale in architectural decoration, being more characteristic of tilework and book illustrations. Instead, it appears on some smaller architectural elements typically seen at close quarters, such as wooden cupboards and window shutters found in the Chamber of Murad III in Topkapı Palace.

Unfortunately, much of the painted decoration from the classical era of Mimar Sinan in the 16th century has been lost. The present-day painted decoration inside the domes of many mosques of the era, including the Süleymaniye in Istanbul and the Selimiye in Edirne, dates from restorations in much later centuries. In the Süleymaniye Mosque – whose dome had to be repaired following its collapse in the 1766 earthquake – the original decoration was described by 16th-century writer Ramazanzade Mehmed as featuring many "sun-like disks" and medallion designs in gold and silver. (A 19th-century restoration by the Fossati brothers repainted the dome in vaguely Baroque style and this decoration has been preserved today.) Only calligraphic inscriptions, which were often faithfully restored, have tended to be preserved to some extent.

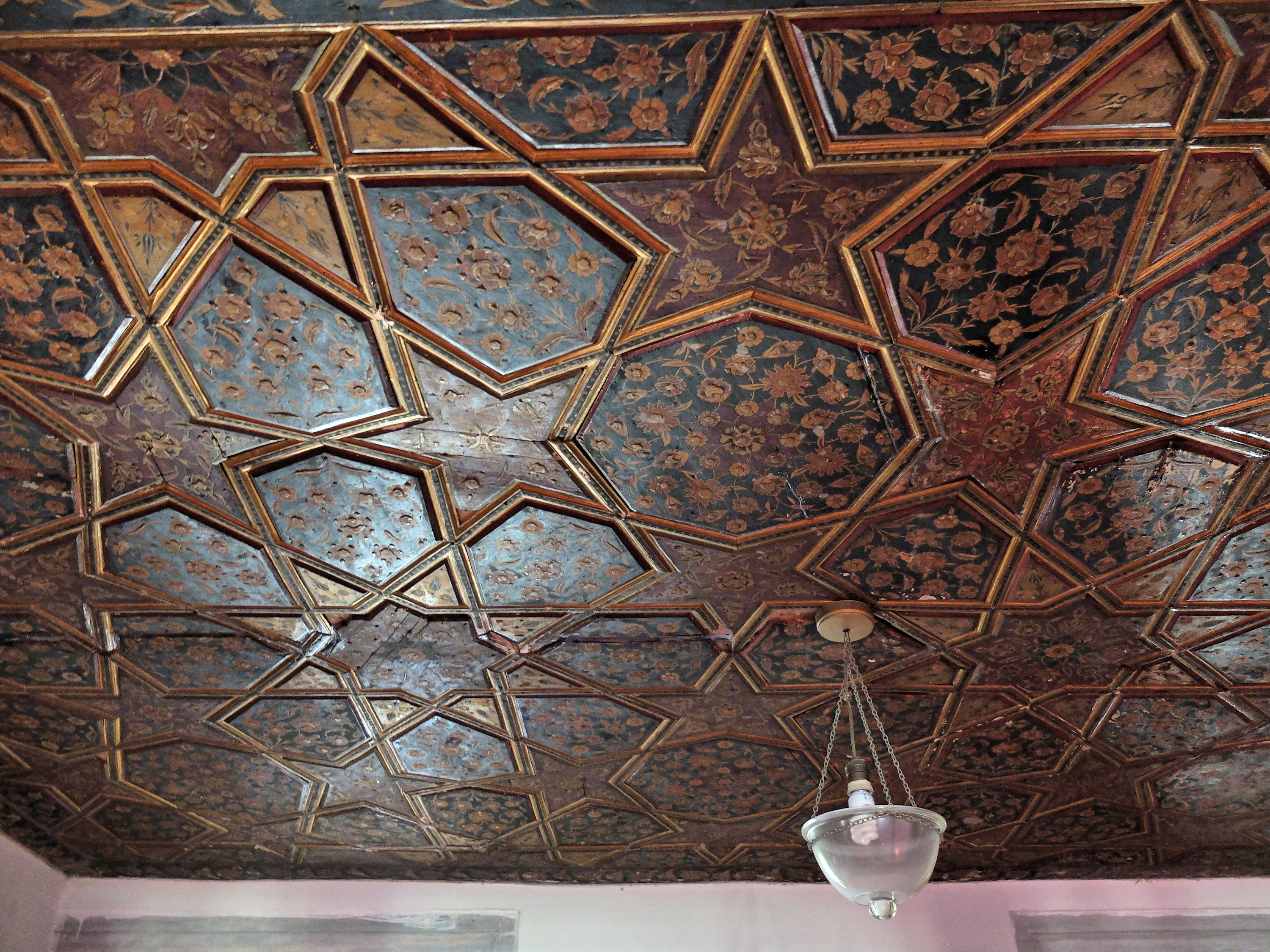
Painted wooden ceiling under the gallery of the Atik Valide Mosque in Üsküdar, circa 1583, with geometric design framing floral motifs

However, some examples of preserved paintwork from the 16th century can still be found here and there. In addition to the examples mentioned above, one important instance is found in the Kara Ahmed Pasha Mosque (circa 1554). Like many of the other preserved examples, the original paintwork visible today is found on the wooden ceilings under the mosque's galleries. The paint is combined with some low-relief plasterwork and gilding, and the predominant colours are red and gold against a blue ground. The design features a central medallion similar to those sometimes used in Ushak carpets, around which are scrolling vegetal motifs, Chinese clouds, and saz-style elements. Another example is the painted wood under the galleries of the Atik Valide Mosque in Üsküdar (circa 1583), which features a geometric pattern of polygons filled with floral motifs. Some traces of original painting can also be seen on the ceiling of the vestibule of the Sokollu Mehmed Pasha Mosque and under some of its galleries. The Muradiye Mosque in Manisa preserves original paintwork on its galleries, its mihrab, and its stone minbar.

=== Later periods ===
Traditional Ottoman motifs maintained a certain formality, with individual elements generally quite stylized. Starting in the second half of the 17th century, this formality loosened and painted decoration underwent a gradual shift in style that can be attributed to European influence. Among other trends, shading was introduced to what had previously been areas of flat colour. The shape of flower motifs also changed and they were depicted with more petals. This is evident not only in new buildings but also in older buildings whose decoration was redone after this period. In some of the latter cases, the traditional designs were retained during restoration but they were updated to include shading. An example of this can be seen in the Sinan Pasha Mosque in Beşiktaş, a 16th-century mosque whose interior was repainted in the 19th century.

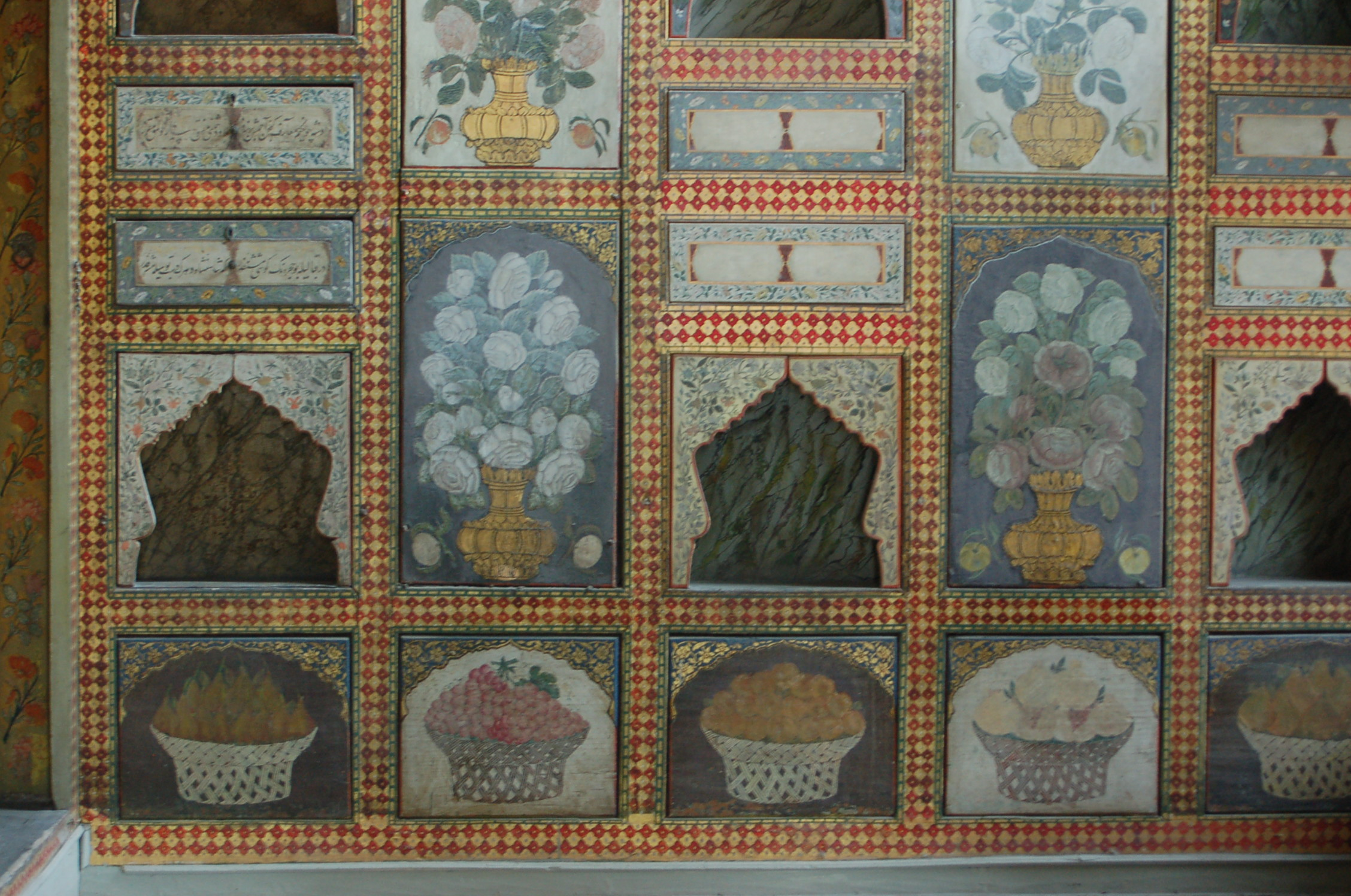
Painted wood decoration in the Fruit Room of Topkapı Palace (1705), depicting fruit bowls and vases of flowers

Around the same time (in the second half of the 17th century), a new style known as Edirnekārī began to appear. (Note: Named after Edirne, where it originated.) It primarily depicted flowers, a traditional Ottoman motif, but with an increased level of naturalism not previously seen in Ottoman art. This trend continued into the 18th century. The reign of Ahmet III (r. 1703–1730), which include the years of the Tulip Period (1718–1730), saw the popularization of a style featuring plentiful depictions of flowers in vases and bowls of fruit, sometimes with shading. The most vivid example of this is the so-called Fruit Room, created by Ahmet III inside Topkapı Palace in 1705, whose wooden walls are covered with such images. Derived from the Edirnekārī style, they have a greater naturalism and are evidently influenced by Western European techniques of illustration.

This new style remained popular until the end of the century. It is often seen on wooden doors and other wooden fixtures from this period. Examples of these are found in other parts of Topkapı Palace as well as on the wooden screen of the upper gallery in the Piyale Pasha Mosque, which was likely added in the 18th century. The style was also popular beyond the capital and can be found as far as Crimea, where the palace of the Crimean khan (an Ottoman vassal) in Bakhchisaray contains wooden panels painted in the same manner.

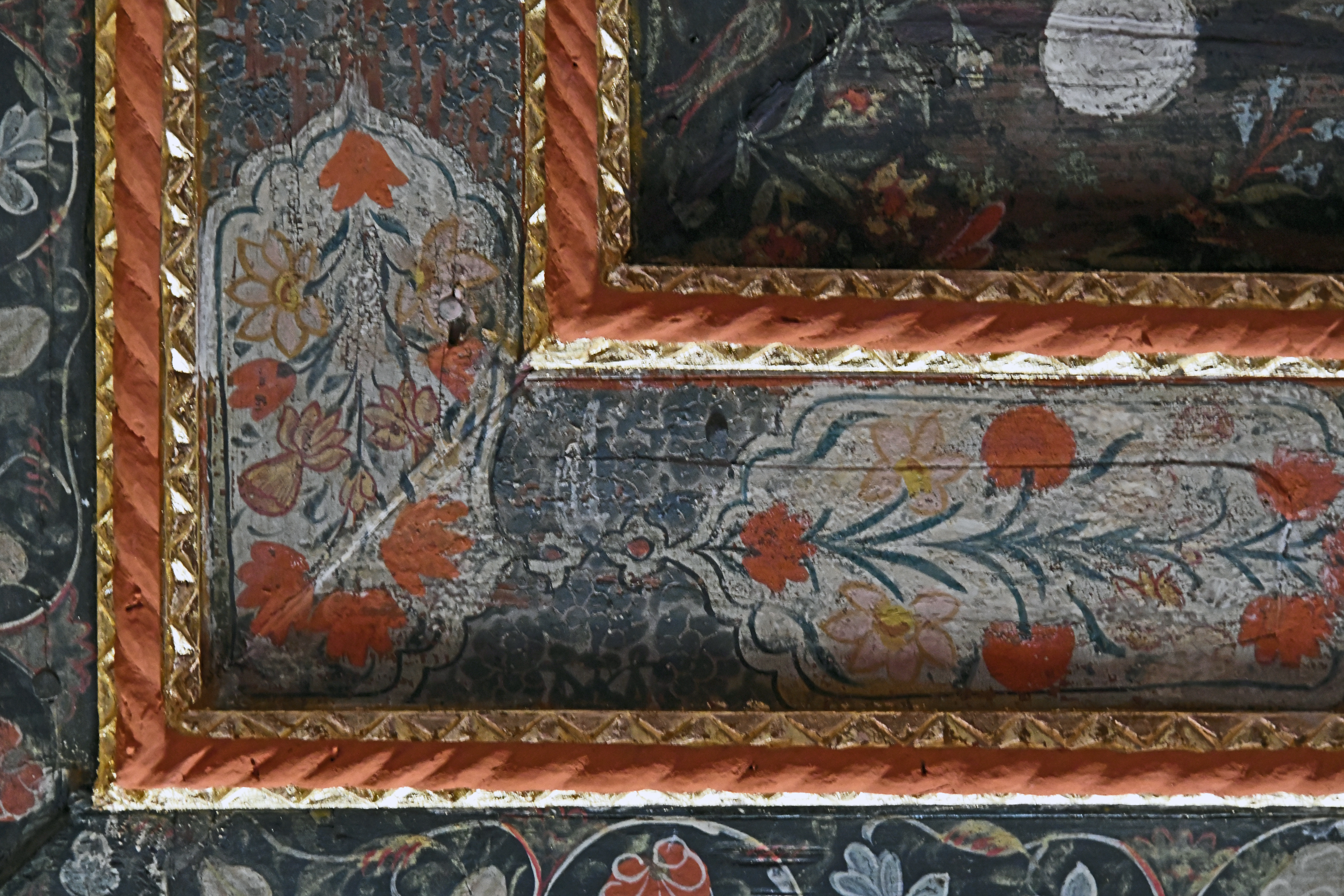
Painted wood ceiling under the gallery of the Damat Ibrahim Pasha Mosque in Nevşehir (circa 1726), showing continued use of more traditional Ottoman floral decoration

The more traditional rumî, hatayî, and saz styles did not disappear yet and continued to be used during this period. The two religious complexes built by Damat Ibrahim Pasha in Istanbul (1720) and in his hometown of Nevşehir (1726), both feature examples of these motifs applied in the malakâri technique. They appear to be similar to the art of contemporary Ottoman painter Ali Üsküdari (d. 1763).

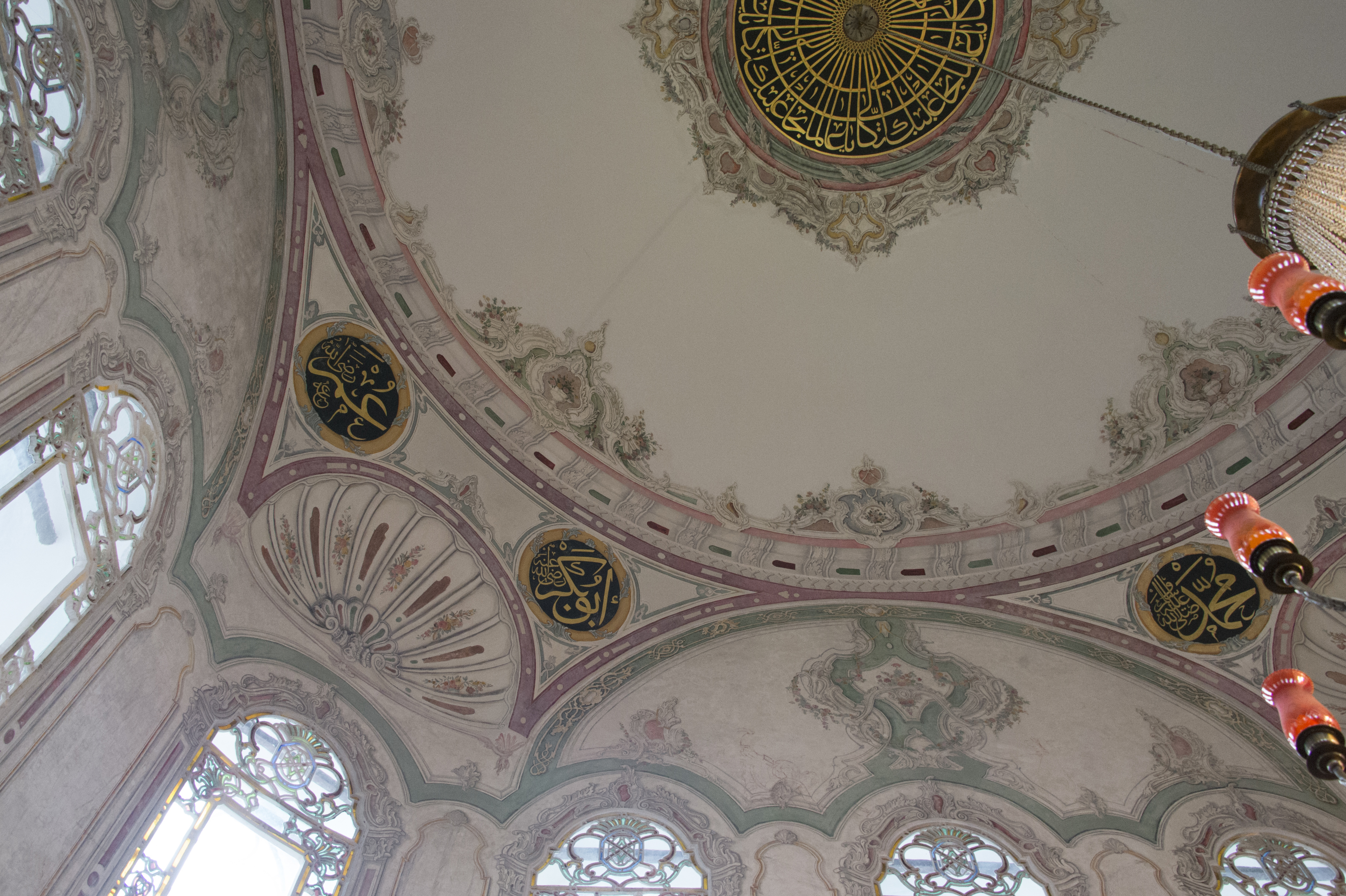
Baroque paintwork inside the Tomb of Abdülhamid I (1775–1780)

The advent of the Ottoman Baroque architectural style in the 1740s also brought new motifs of European origin or influence. For example, traditional Ottoman medallion designs could now be replaced with European-style cartouches. A rare example of painted decoration from this time that still survives in its original state can be found in the library of the Hacı Beşir Ağa Mosque in Istanbul (1744–1745). Here, the vaulted ceiling is painted with a central cartouche and a field of pink and yellow ovals surrounded by European strapwork motifs. Many other Ottoman Baroque mosques have since been repainted and much of the original composition or character of their painted decoration has been lost. The interior of the Nuruosmaniye Mosque (1748–1755), one of the most important monuments of the period, has been repainted in this manner; however, a recent restoration has uncovered some of the original paintwork in its dome, which is now visible. Recent restoration of Abdülhamid I's Tomb (1775–1780) has also managed to recover some of the original paintwork under layers of later repainting, revealing Rococo motifs in shades of green and pink.

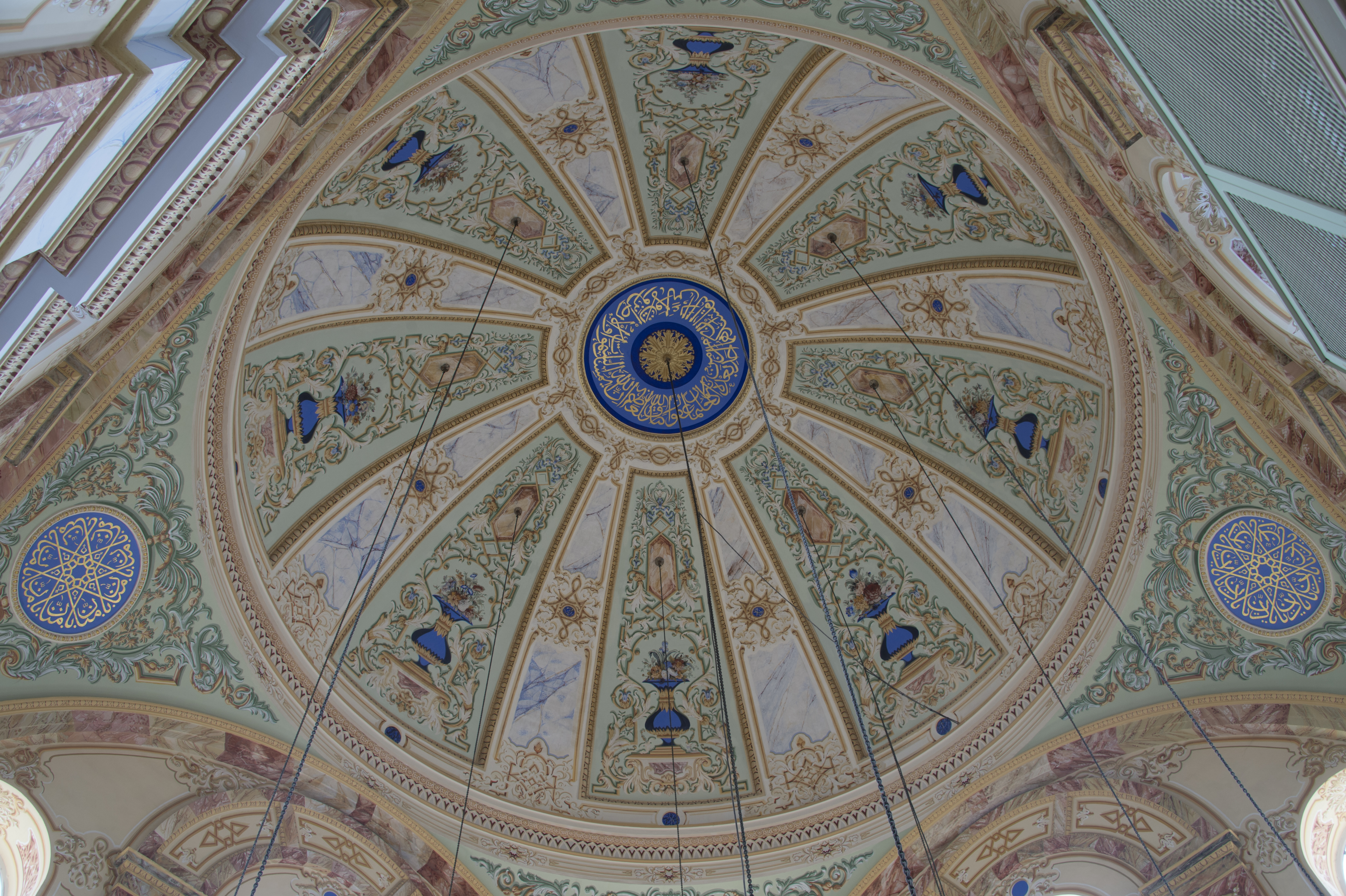
19th-century paintwork inside the Altunizade Mosque (circa 1866), showing further European influence of this era

By the end of the 18th century, styles of painted decoration were changing again, further influenced by Europe. The new repertoire of motifs came to include garlands, ribbons, flower bouquets, and baskets of roses. Decoration could now be painted to appear three-dimensional, adding a new visual effect even when otherwise traditional motifs were used. This style is found in many mosques and palaces built or restored in the 19th century. Grisaille was also used in some cases. In the Ayazma Mosque, for example, the 18th-century decoration was repainted in the 19th century by keeping the same motifs of flower vases but rendering them in shades of grey and black. Murals of naturalistic landscapes also became common from the late 18th century onward, especially in the interior decoration of palaces.

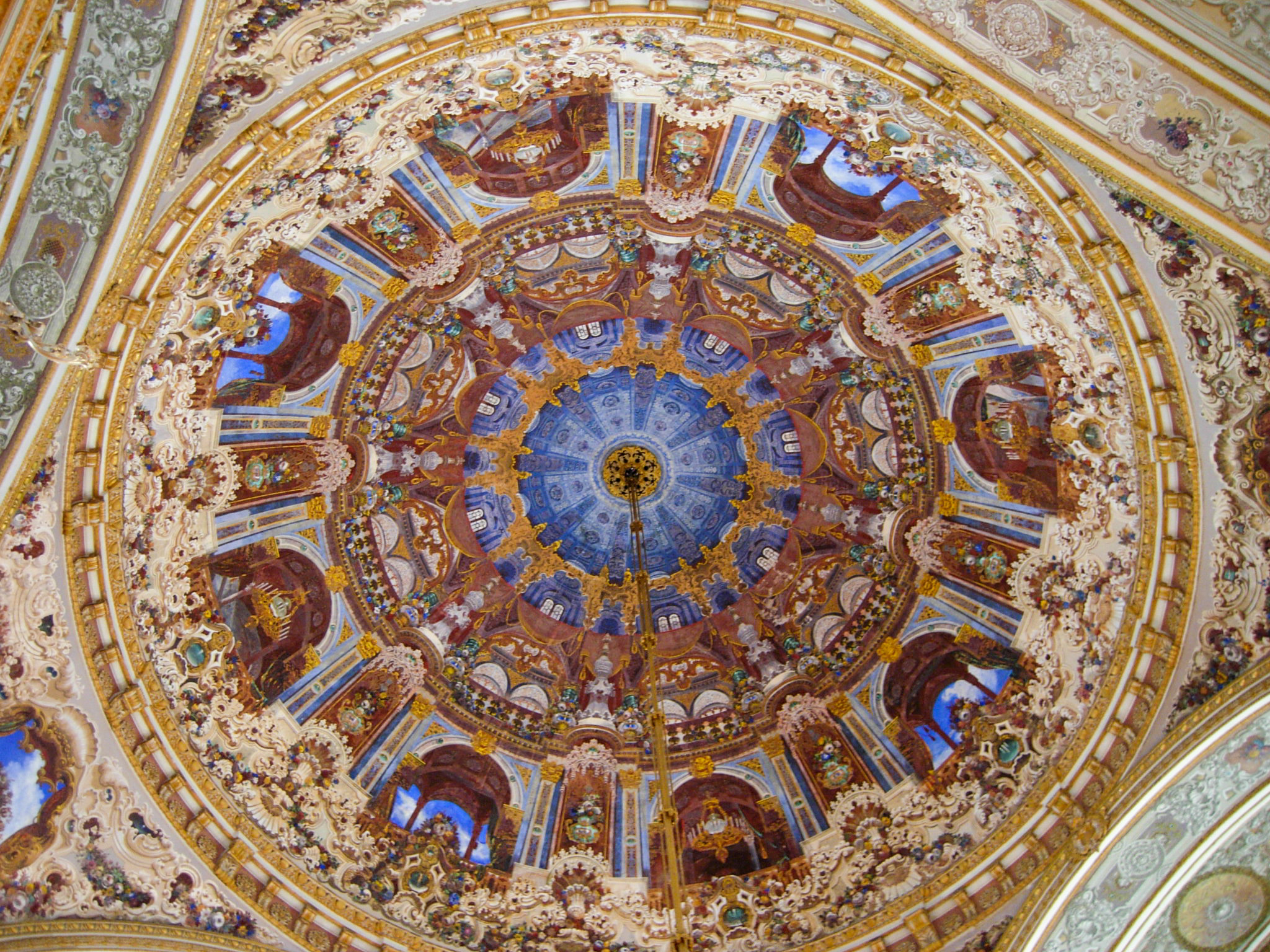
Dome of the Ceremonial Hall in the Dolmabahçe Palace in Istanbul (1843–1856), painted with trompe-l'œil

Lastly, the trompe-l'œil technique was also imported into the empire and can be found both in Istanbul and beyond. Although some minor details of earlier paintwork were suggestive of this technique (e.g. in the Ayazma Mosque), its effective use only began during the reign of Abdülmecid I (r. 1839–1861), when specialists in this type of painting were most likely hired for the purpose. An example from this period is the Ortaköy Mosque, built in the 1850s, where the painted dome features trompe-l'oeil imagery depicting neo-Renaissance architecture mixed with rows of Islamic-style mihrabs that replicate the design of the mosque's actual mihrab below. Trompe-l'oeil is also found in the Dolmabaçe Palace (built 1843–1856), mixing both European and neo-Islamic motifs. A later example can be found in the Pertevniyal Valide Sultan Mosque (1871), whose overall decorative scheme mixes European, Ottoman, and Islamic revivalist motifs.

== Stone carving ==
Compared to the Anatolian Seljuk architecture that came before it, Ottoman architecture treated stone carving as a less important decorative medium. This may be because the artisans responsible for stone carving under the Seljuks and Beyliks were concentrated in central and eastern Anatolia, as opposed to western Anatolia, where early Ottoman architecture developed. The Ottomans also did not continue the Seljuk tradition of constructing monumental stone portals covered in ornamentation. Lastly, as the classical Ottoman style took form, large solid walls that were common in more traditional structures were superseded by highly articulated structures with many elements joined as part of a more complex whole. This likely made the decoration of large wall surfaces a much less important element of building design.

=== Early and classical periods ===
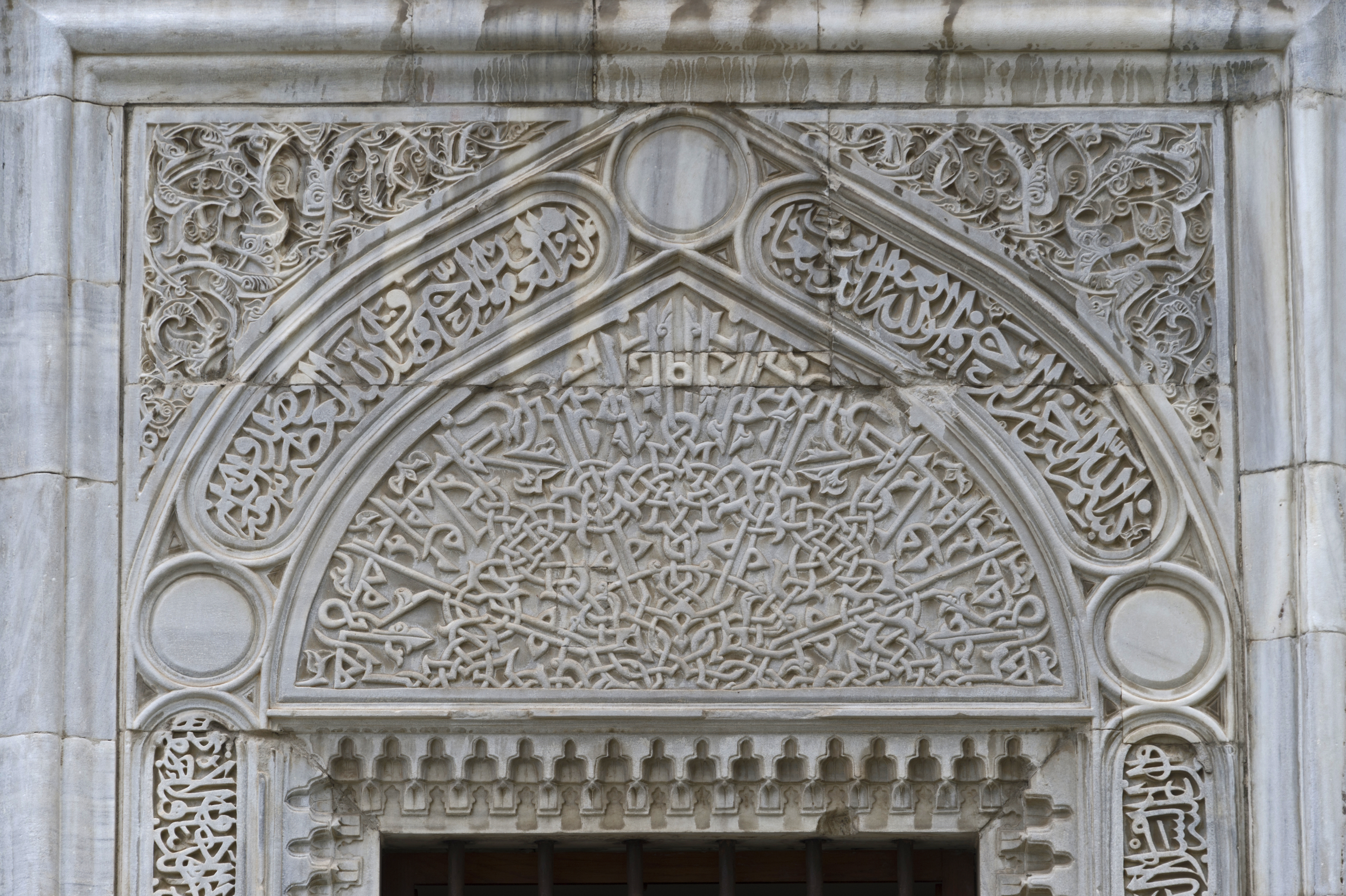
Stone-carved arabesque and calligraphy at the Green Mosque in Bursa (1412–1424)

In the early Ottoman period, an exception to this paucity of traditional stone carving is the Green Mosque in Bursa, which features skilled carving of marble surfaces into vegetal arabesque and calligraphic motifs. This was generally not repeated in subsequent Ottoman monuments, with the partial exception of mihrabs.

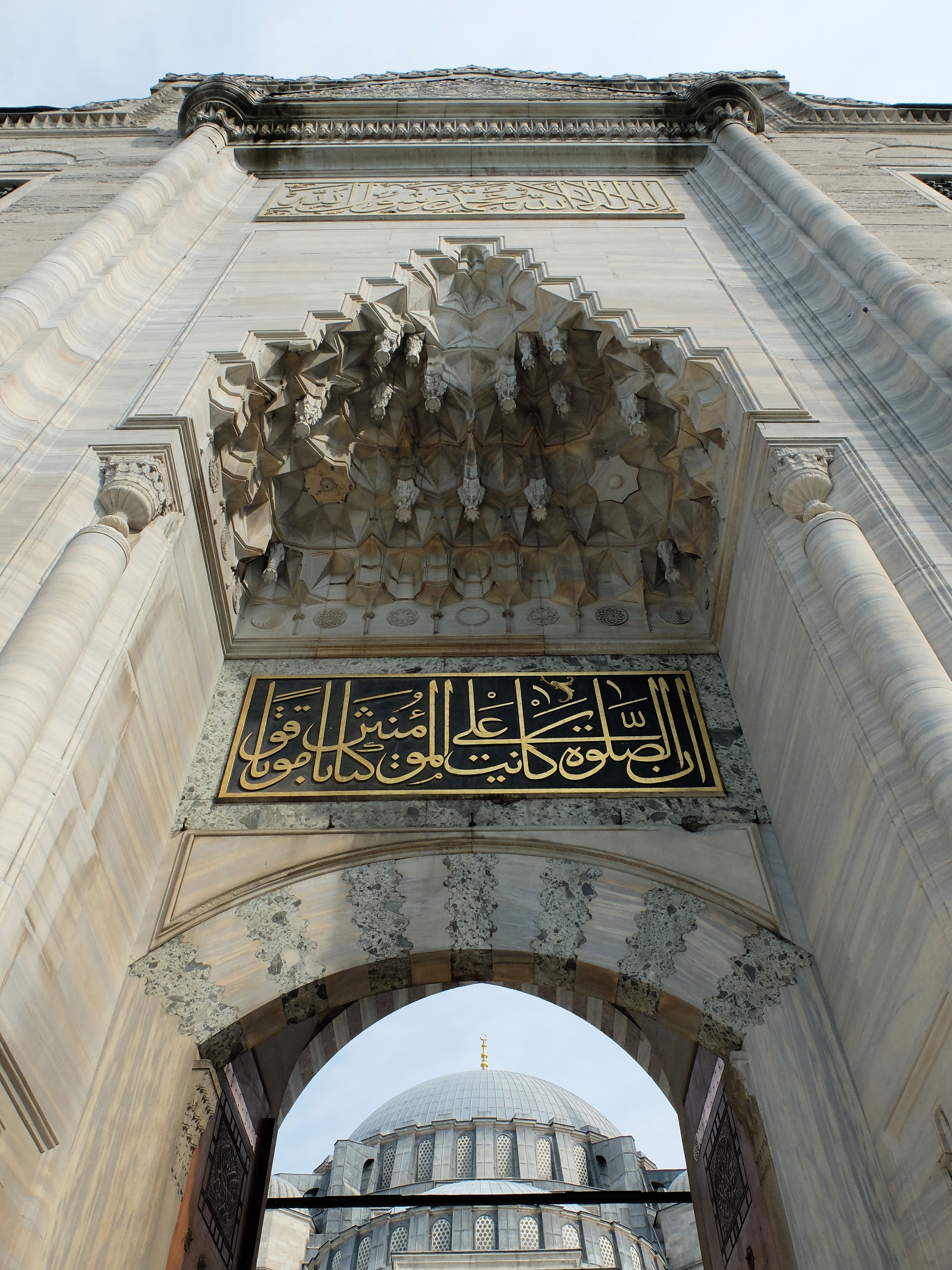
Entrance portal with a muqarnas vault and inscription panels at the Süleymaniye Mosque in Istanbul (1550–1557)

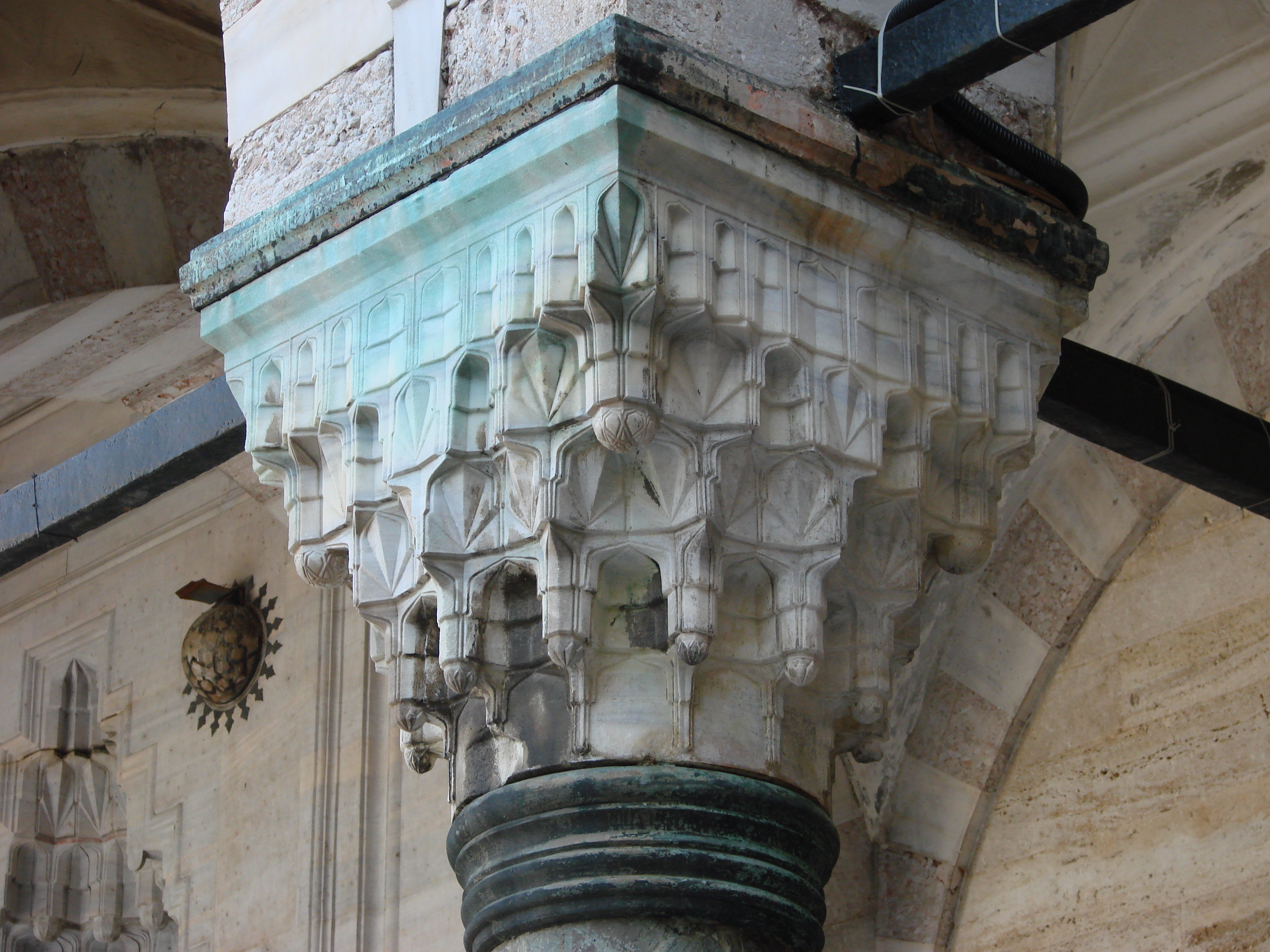
Muqarnas capital in the Bayezid II Mosque, Istanbul (1501–1506)

Nonetheless, high-quality stone carving was still used to enrich the details of buildings throughout the Ottoman period, particularly for entrance portals, minaret balconies, niches, column capitals, and moldings. One of the main decorative techniques in this medium was muqarnas (or "stalactite") carving, which is used in all of these aforementioned elements. Since the Seljuk era, muqarnas semi-vaults had been a typical feature of entrance portals and mihrabs, and this tradition continued in Ottoman mosques.

High-quality stonework was also evident in the geometric openwork in stone balustrades and in marble minbars. In addition to the common muqarnas capitals, another type of capital was sculpted with a series of flat lozenge surfaces that combined to form a transition from circular base to square top, similar to the "Turkish triangles" used as transitions between square rooms and domes. Marble surfaces were occasionally carved with tracery motifs in relief, including in rumî style, but this was mostly limited to certain surfaces around mihrabs.

Aside from these features, which were characteristic of buildings, Ottoman tombstones are notable for their very rich stone-carved ornamentation. The decoration of tombstones included vegetal and floral motifs, stone caps in the shape of headgear reflecting the social status of the deceased (usually for men), and, most consistently of all, inscriptions in graceful calligraphy. The level of tombstone ornamentation increased after the late 17th century and followed the stylistic changes that occurred afterwards in architecture.

=== Later periods ===
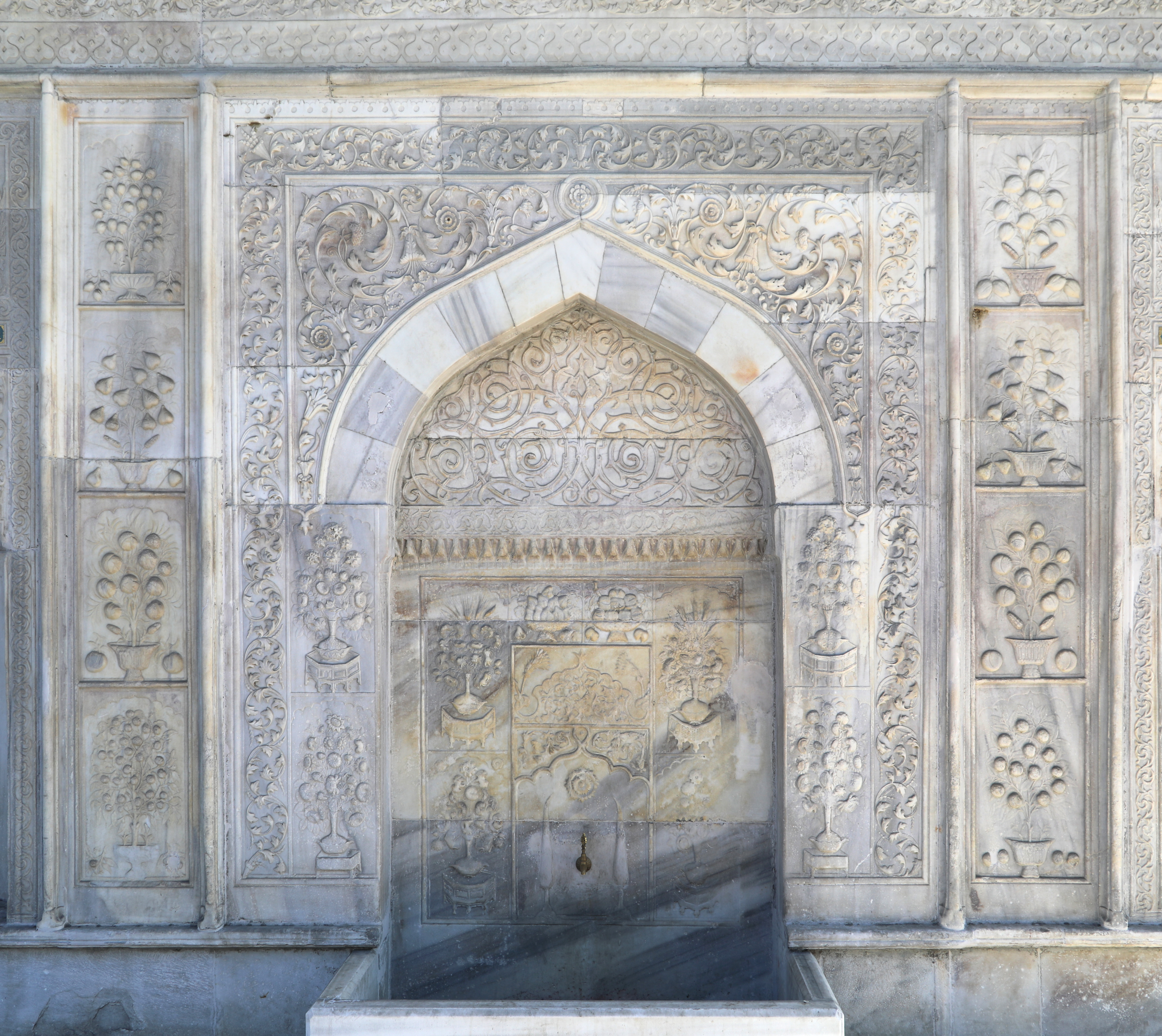
Floral motifs carved in marble on the Tophane Fountain in Istanbul (1732), typical of the Tulip Period style

In the early 18th century, around the Tulip Period, diverse new floral motifs were added to the decorative repertoire of buildings. These can be found in carved reliefs, employed most prolifically on the façades of fountains and sebils, which became common types of monuments commissioned during this century. The motifs include flowers, fruits, garlands, and rosettes, as well as designs developed from the hatayî style previously used for painted decoration. Some traditional techniques like muqarnas and openwork also continued to appear.

With the advent of the Ottoman Baroque in the 18th century, Ottoman stone carving borrowed motifs directly from the relief ornamentation in French Rococo architecture, including acanthus leaves, shells, baroque moldings, and mixtilinear arch forms. This was evident first and foremost in new fountains and sebils. Although many novelties were introduced, one traditional feature that continued throughout this period were the calligraphic inscriptions placed in panels over gates, in friezes, and in other prominent locations.

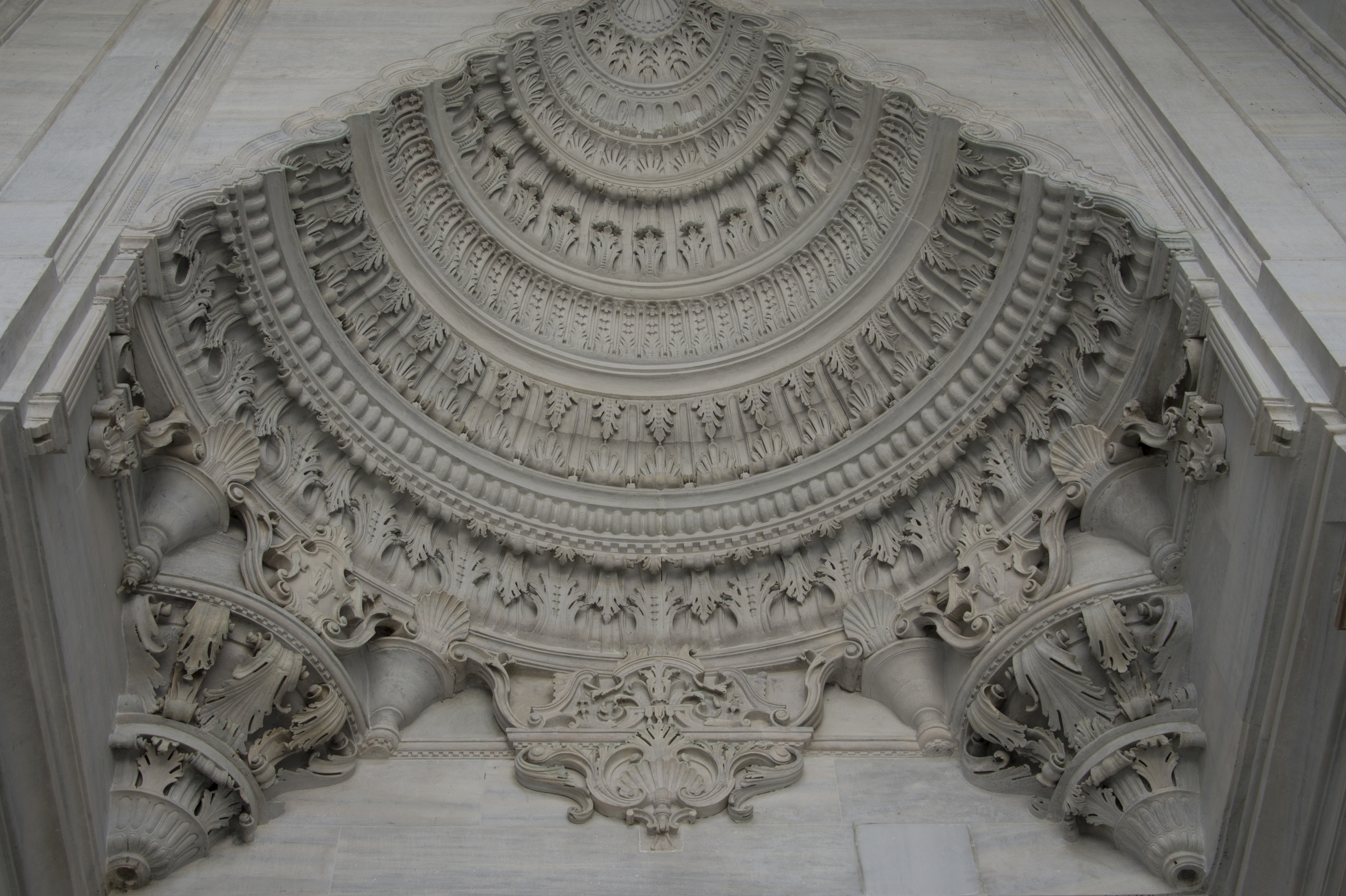
Entrance portal at the Nuruosmaniye Mosque in Istanbul (1748–1755), where traditional muqarnas has been replaced with baroque-style moldings and acanthus friezes

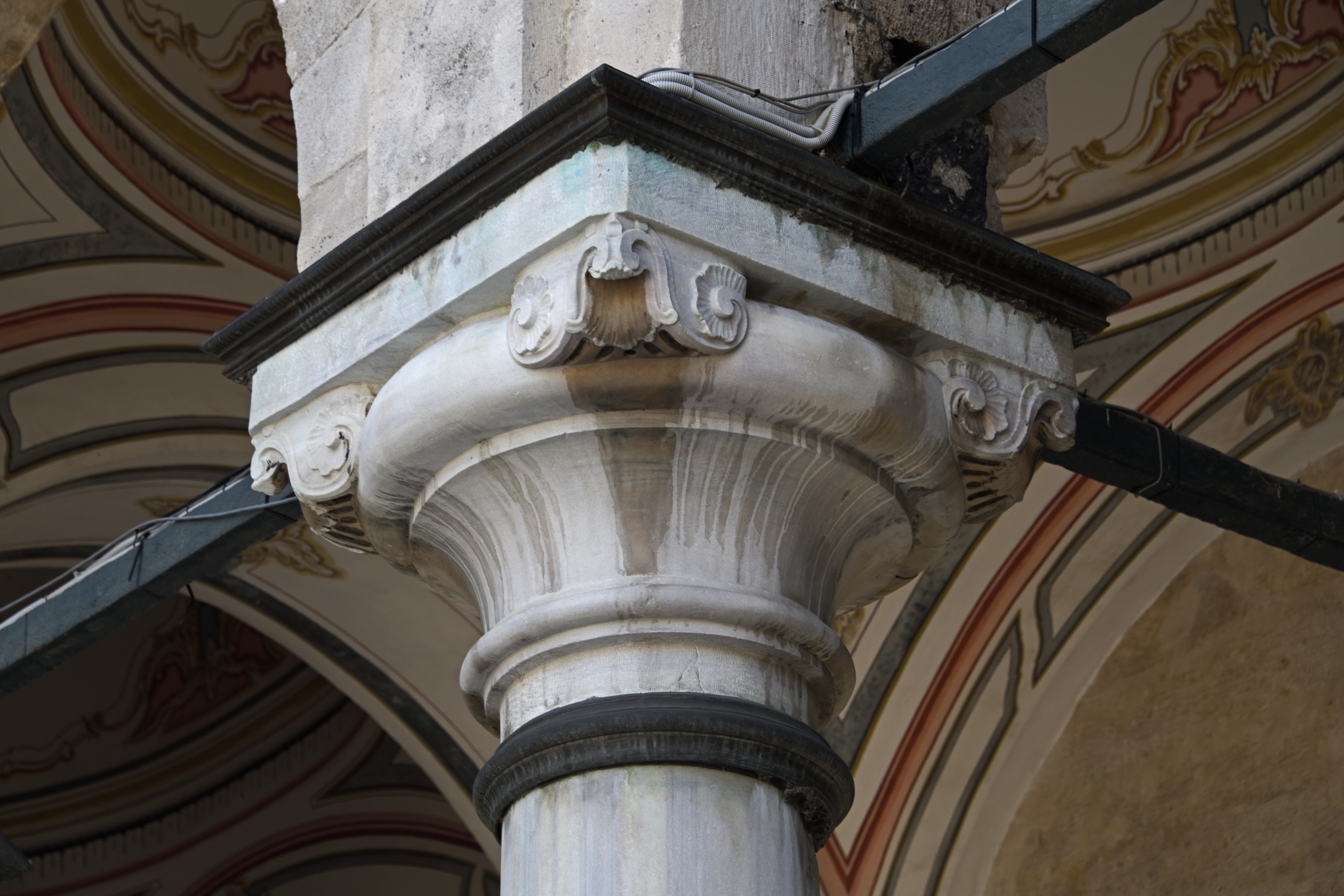
Baroque-style capital in the Laleli Mosque, Istanbul (1757–1761)

The Nuruosmaniye Mosque (1748–1755) helped to establish a new style of column capital for this era: shaped like an inverse bell, either plain or covered with fluting or other carved details, and often with volutes at its upper corners. The design of mosque portals also changed. The central gate to the courtyard of the Nuruosmaniye is topped by a semi-circular sunburst motif, and a simplified version of this motif also appears on the central gate of the Laleli Mosque (1757–1761). The inner and lateral gates of the Nuruosmaniye are marked by unique designs: they are topped by semi-vaults which are carved with rows of various moldings and acanthus friezes that replace the traditional muqarnas. A similar design of baroque moldings are also found in the niches of the mihrabs of this era, again replacing the former muqarnas niches, while the muqarnas corbelling of minaret balconies was replaced by tiers of circular rings.

== See also ==
- Ottoman architecture in the 19th–20th centuries
- Islamic ornament
- Turkish art
- Ottoman miniature

== Bibliography ==
- Aslanapa, Oktay (1971). Turkish Art and Architecture. Praeger Publ.
- Bağcı, Serpil (2002). "Painted Decoration in Ottoman Architecture". In Inalcık, Halil; Renda, Günsel (eds.). Ottoman Civilization. Vol. 2. Ankara: Republic of Turkey, Ministry of Culture. pp. 737–759. ISBN 9751730732.
- Blair, Sheila S.; Bloom, Jonathan M. (1995). The Art and Architecture of Islam 1250–1800. Yale University Press. ISBN 9780300064650.
- Carswell, John (2006). Iznik Pottery (Second ed.). British Museum Press. ISBN 9780714124414.
- Goodwin, Godfrey (1971). A History of Ottoman Architecture. Thames & Hudson. ISBN 0-500-27429-0.
- Kuban, Doğan (2010). Ottoman Architecture. Translated by Mill, Adair. Antique Collectors' Club. ISBN 9781851496044.
- Necipoğlu, Gülru (2011) [2005]. The Age of Sinan: Architectural Culture in the Ottoman Empire (Revised ed.). Reaktion Books. ISBN 9781861892539.
- Öney, Gönül (2002). "Ottoman Tiles and Pottery". In Inalcık, Halil; Renda, Günsel (eds.). Ottoman Civilization. Vol. 2. Ankara: Republic of Turkey, Ministry of Culture. pp. 698–735. ISBN 9751730732.
- Ruggles, D. Fairchild (2008). Islamic Gardens and Landscape. Philadelphia, Pennsylvania: University of Pennsylvania Press. ISBN 9780812240252. JSTOR j.ctt3fhhqz.
- Rüstem, Ünver (2019). Ottoman Baroque: The Architectural Refashioning of Eighteenth-Century Istanbul. Princeton University Press. ISBN 9780691181875.
- Sumner-Boyd, Hilary; Freely, John (2010). Strolling Through Istanbul: The Classic Guide to the City (Revised ed.). Tauris Parke Paperbacks. ISBN 978-0-85773-005-3.
- Wharton, Alyson (2015). The Architects of Ottoman Constantinople: The Balyan Family and the History of Ottoman Architecture. Bloomsbury Publishing. ISBN 978-0-85773-813-4.
