= Kara Ahmed Pasha Mosque =

Mosque in Istanbul, Turkey

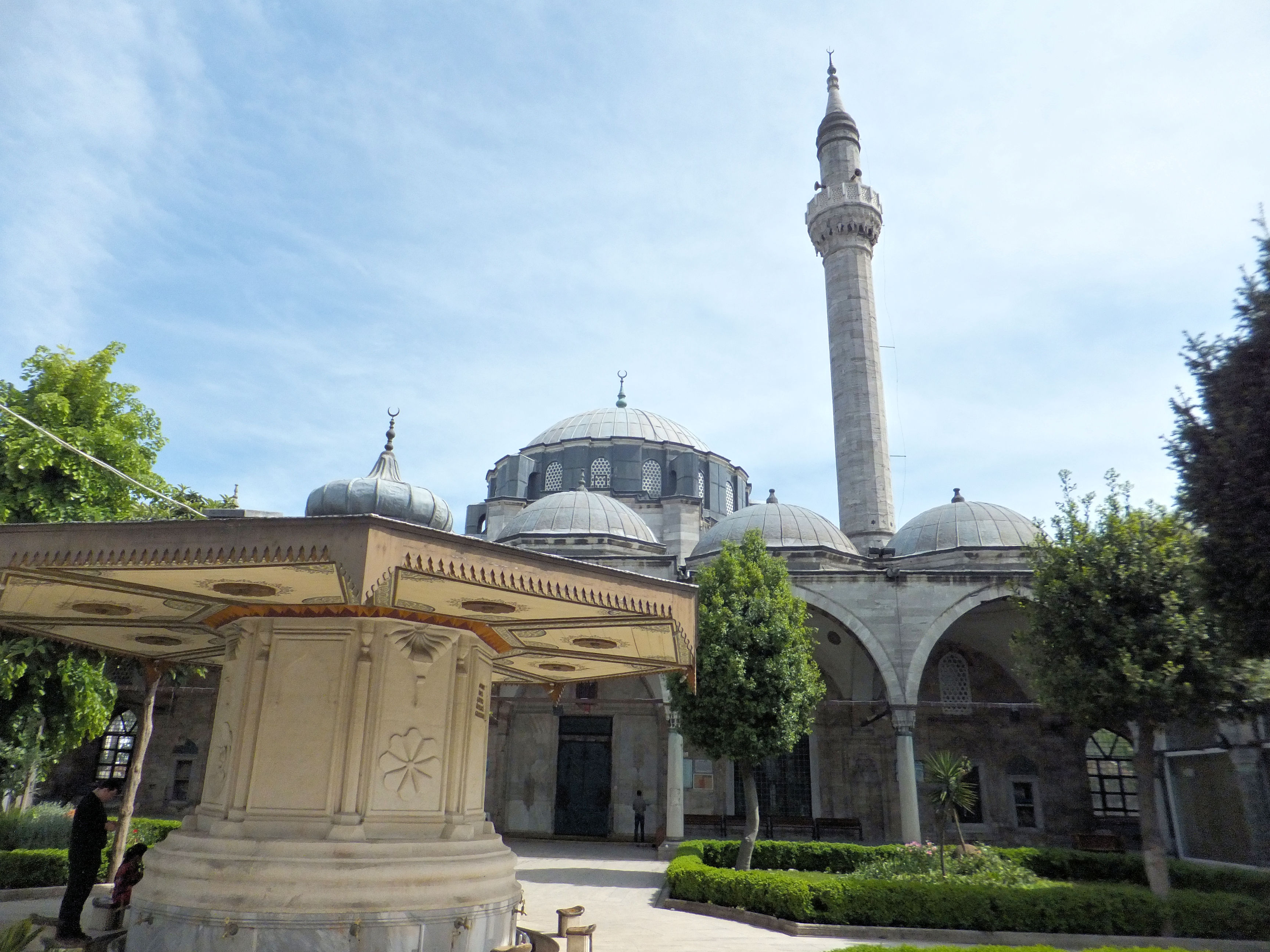

- Location within the Fatih district of Istanbul

Religion
- Affiliation: Sunni Islam

Location
- Location: Istanbul, Turkey
- Coordinates: 41°01′16″N 28°55′45″E

Architecture
- Architect: Mimar Sinan
- Type: mosque
- Style: Ottoman
- Groundbreaking: 1555
- Completed: c. 1572

Specifications
- Dome dia. (outer): 12.0 m (39.4 ft)
- Minaret: 1
- Materials: ashlar masonry

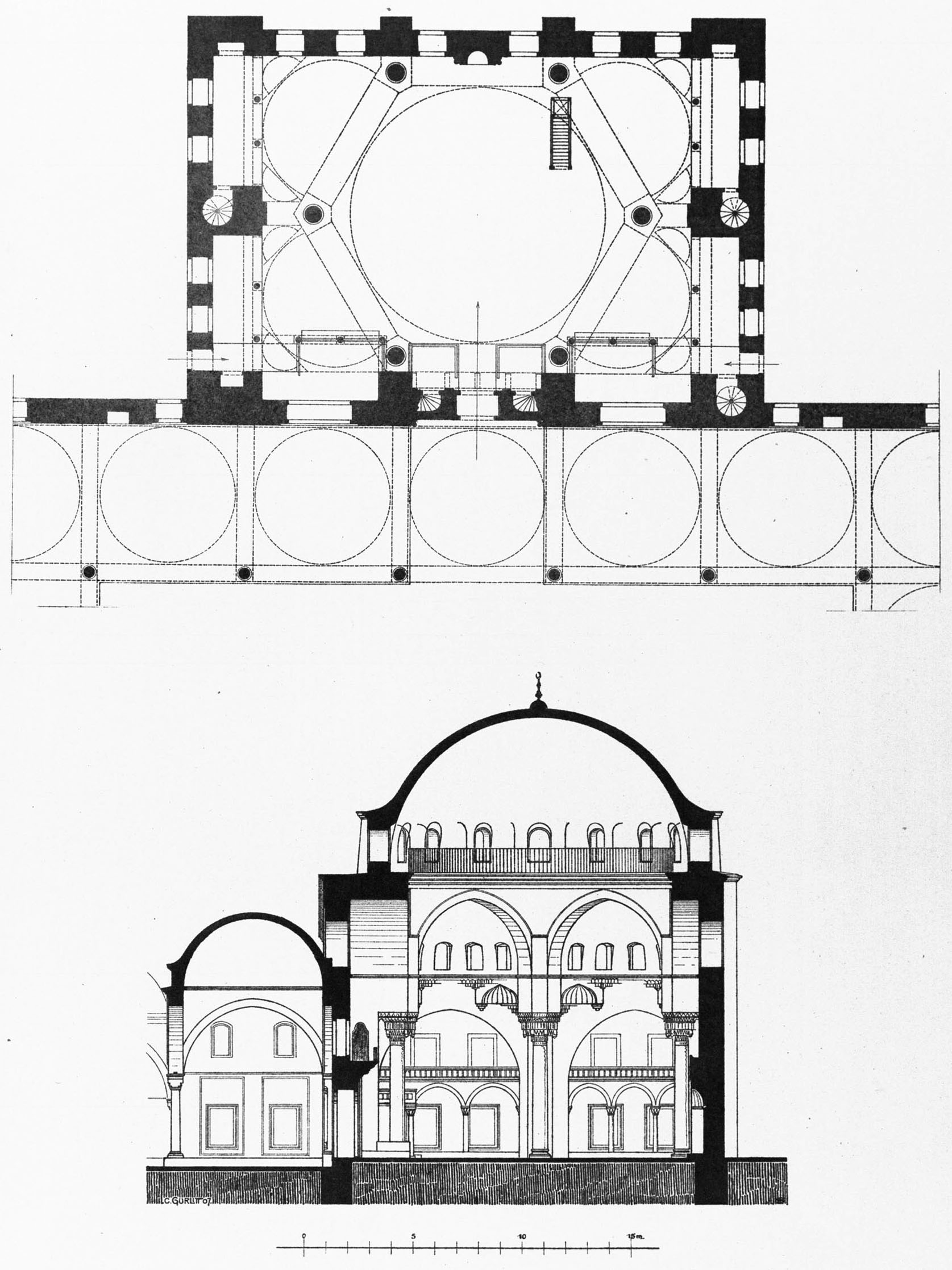
Cross section and plan of the mosque published by Cornelius Gurlitt in 1912

The Kara Ahmed Pasha Mosque or Gazi Ahmed Pasha Mosque (Turkish: Kara Ahmet Paşa Camii) is a 16th-century Ottoman mosque near the city walls in Istanbul, Turkey. It was designed by the imperial architect Mimar Sinan and completed in around 1572.

== History ==
The mosque was commissioned by Kara Ahmed Pasha who was married to Fatma Sultan, a daughter of Selim I. He became grand vizier under Suleiman the Magnificent in 1553 but was executed by strangulation two years later in 1555. The mosque was planned in around 1555 but only constructed between 1565 and 1571–72 after the pasha had been fully exonerated.

== Architecture ==
The courtyard is surrounded by the cells of a medrese and a dershane, or main classroom. Attractive apple green and yellow tiles grace the porch, while blue and white ones are found on the qibla wall wall of the prayer hall. These tiles date from the mid 16th century. The 12 m (39 ft) diameter dome is supported by six red granite columns. Of the three galleries, the wooden ceiling under the west one is elaborately painted in red, blue, gold and black. The mosque is last imperial building in Istanbul to be decorated with expressly designed cuerda seca tilework. Later buildings were decorated with tiles that were painted under a clear glaze. The minaret is placed at the northwest corner of the mosque. It was restored in 1696 and in again 1896.

== Gallery ==
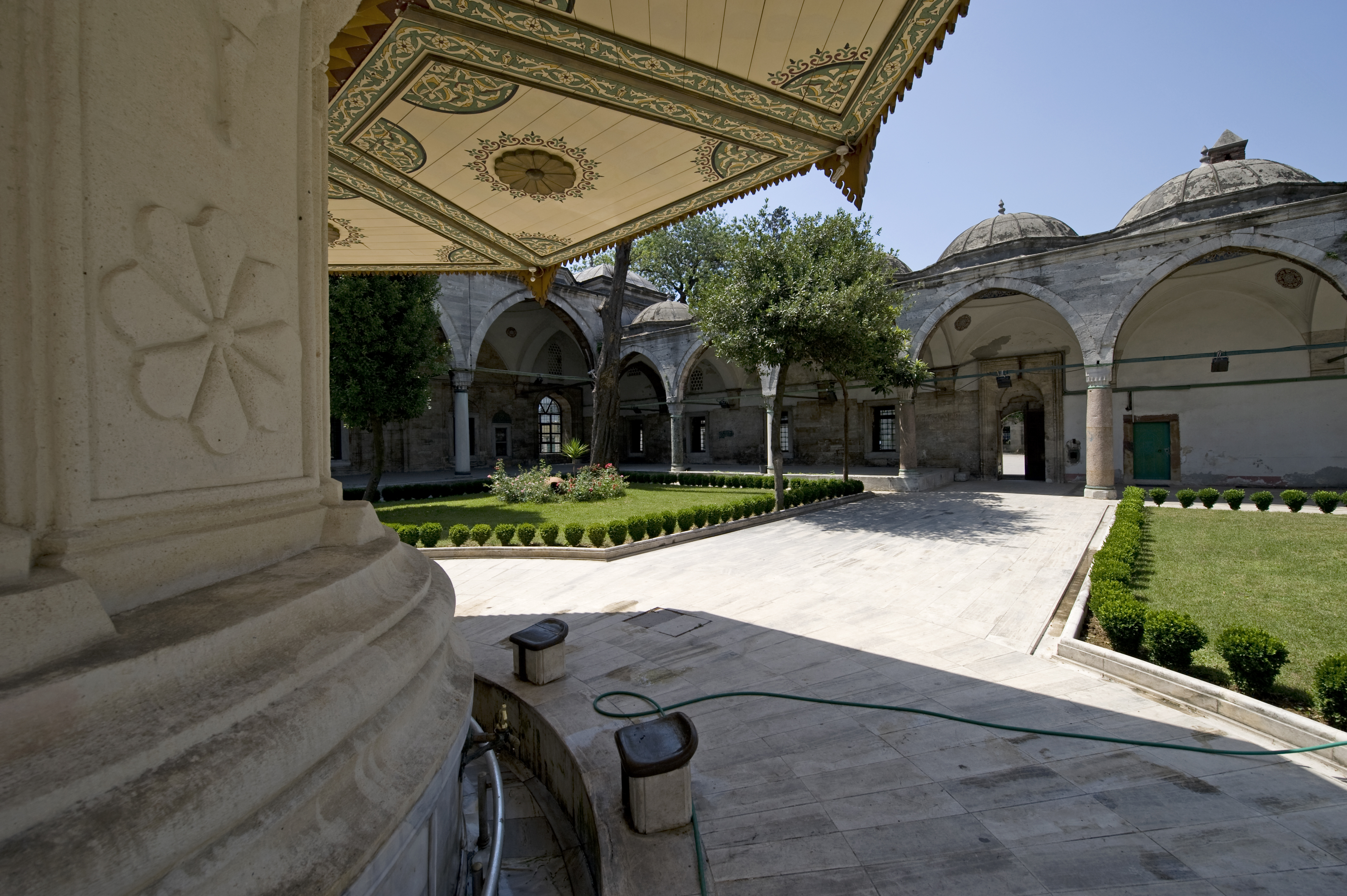
Courtyard with ablution fountain

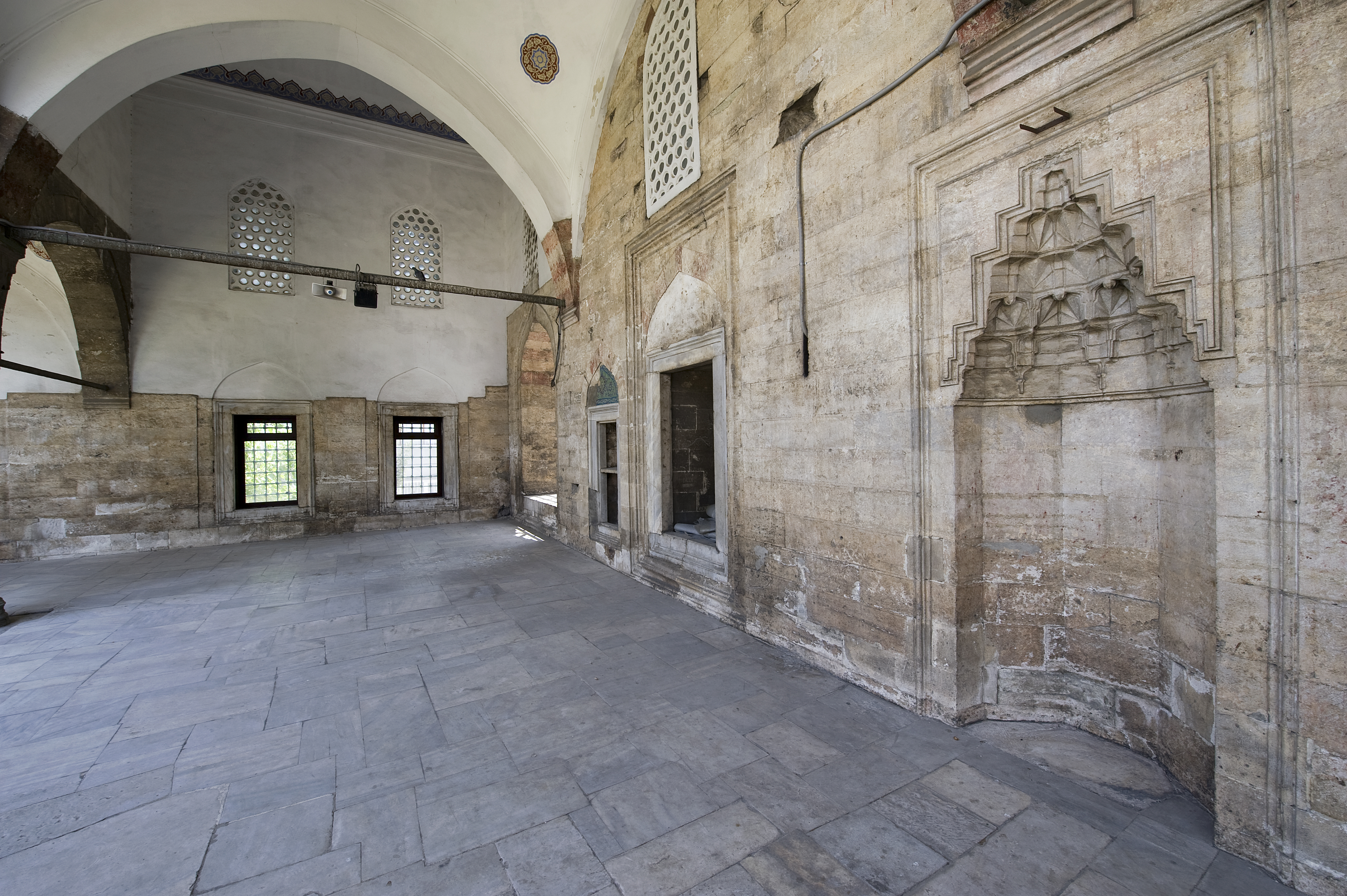
Portico

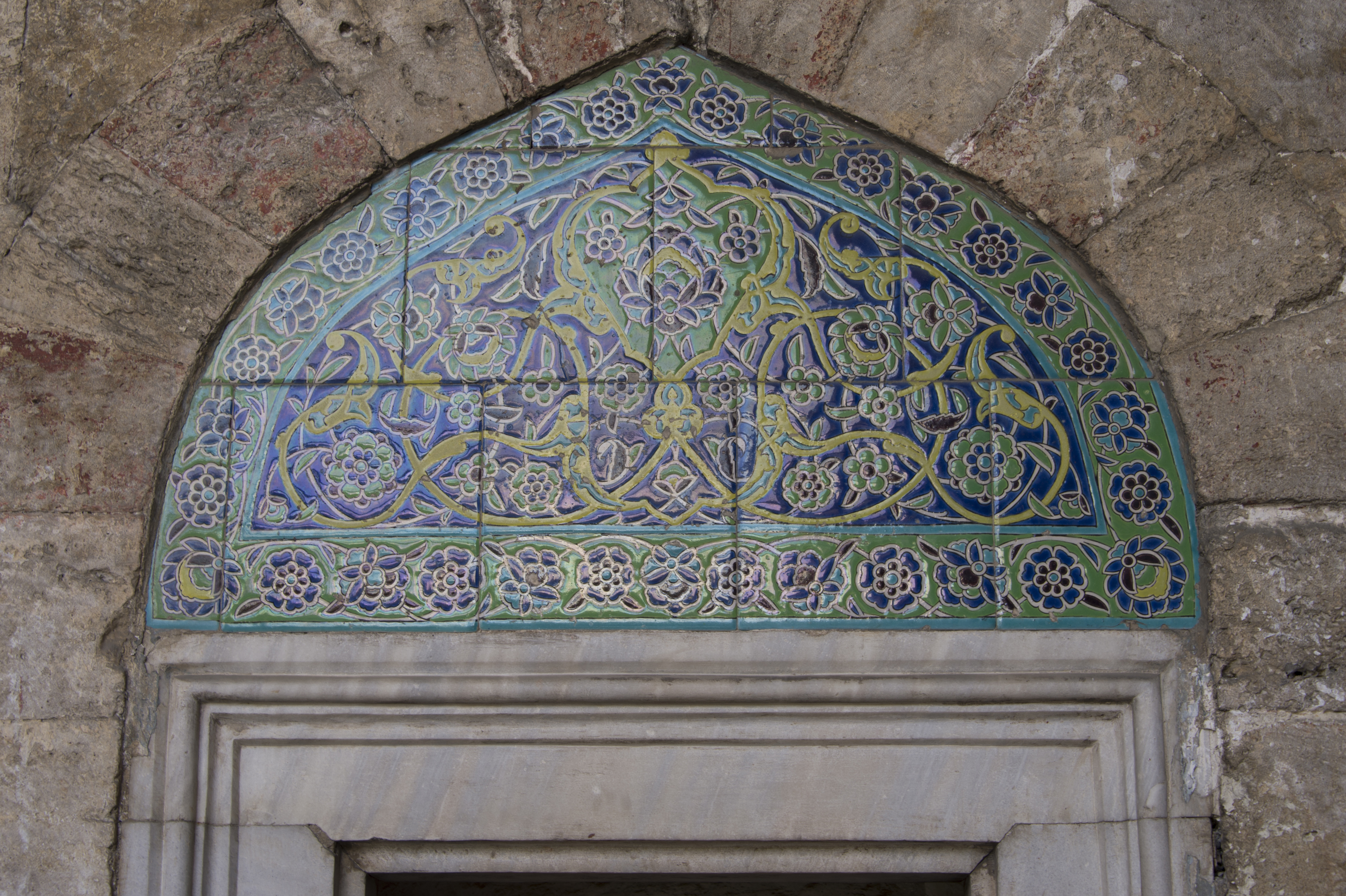
Cuerda seca tiled lunette above a niche under the portico

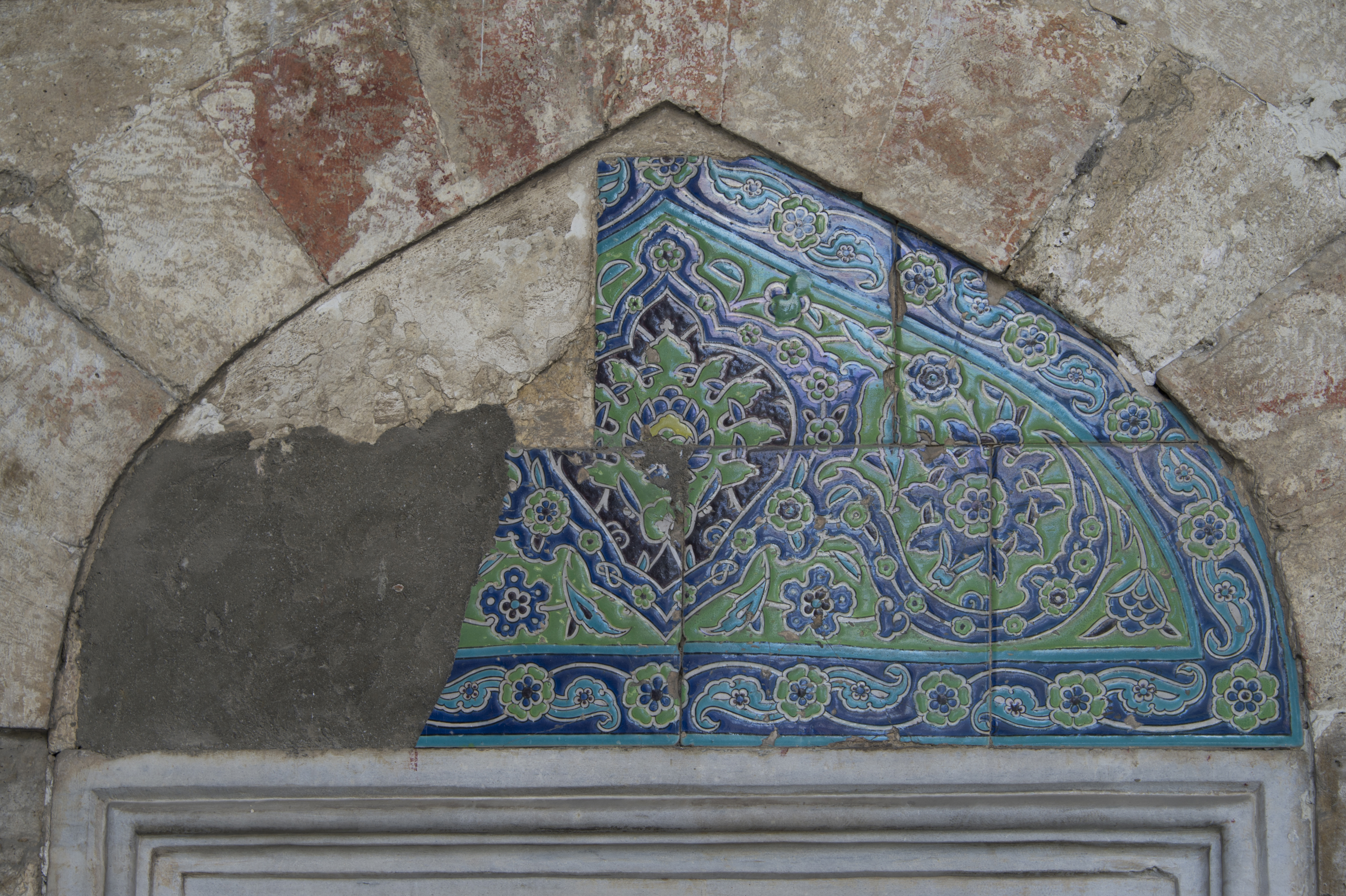
Cuerda seca tiled lunette above a niche under the portico

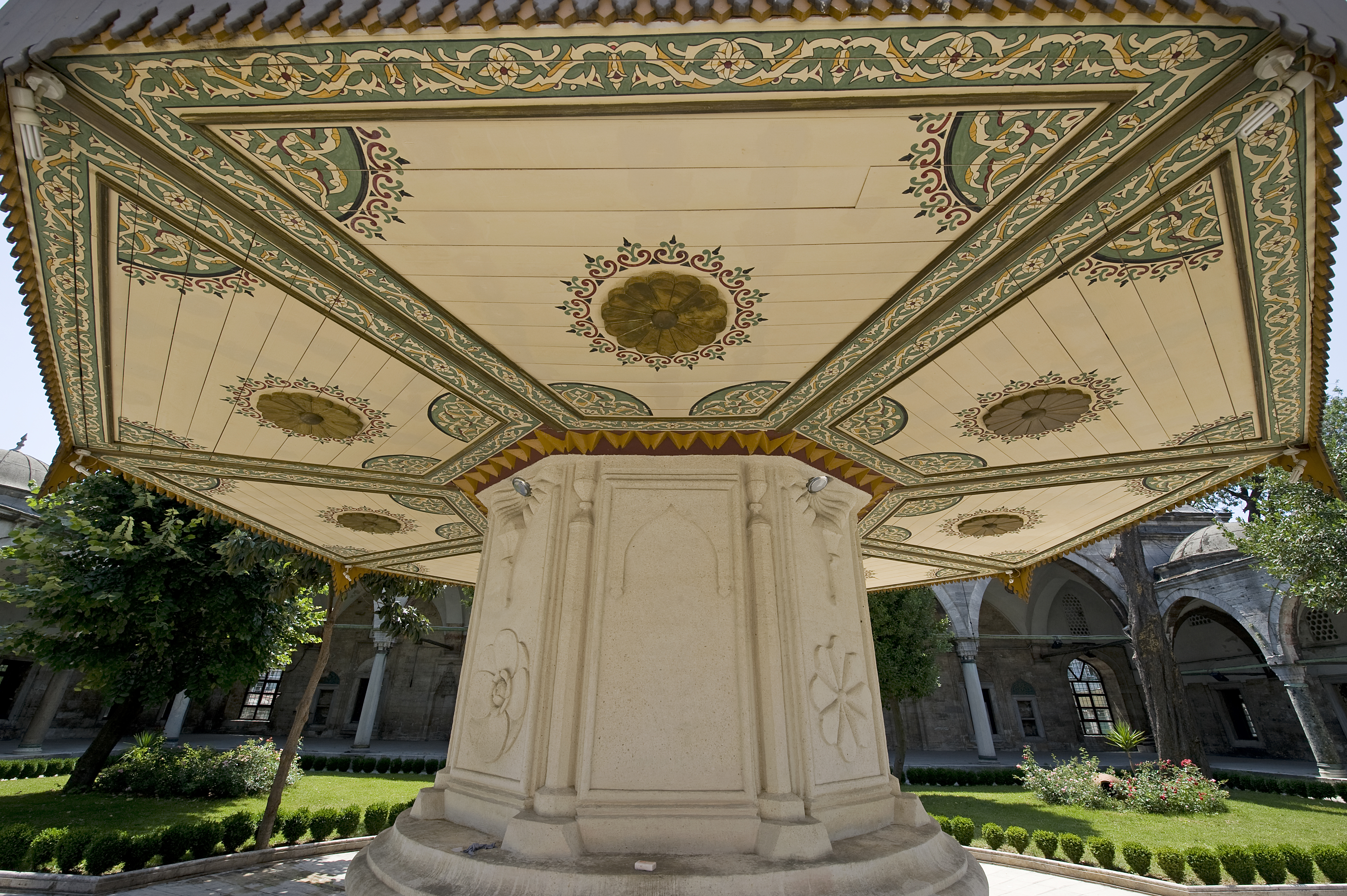
Ablution fountain. The domed canopy is modern.

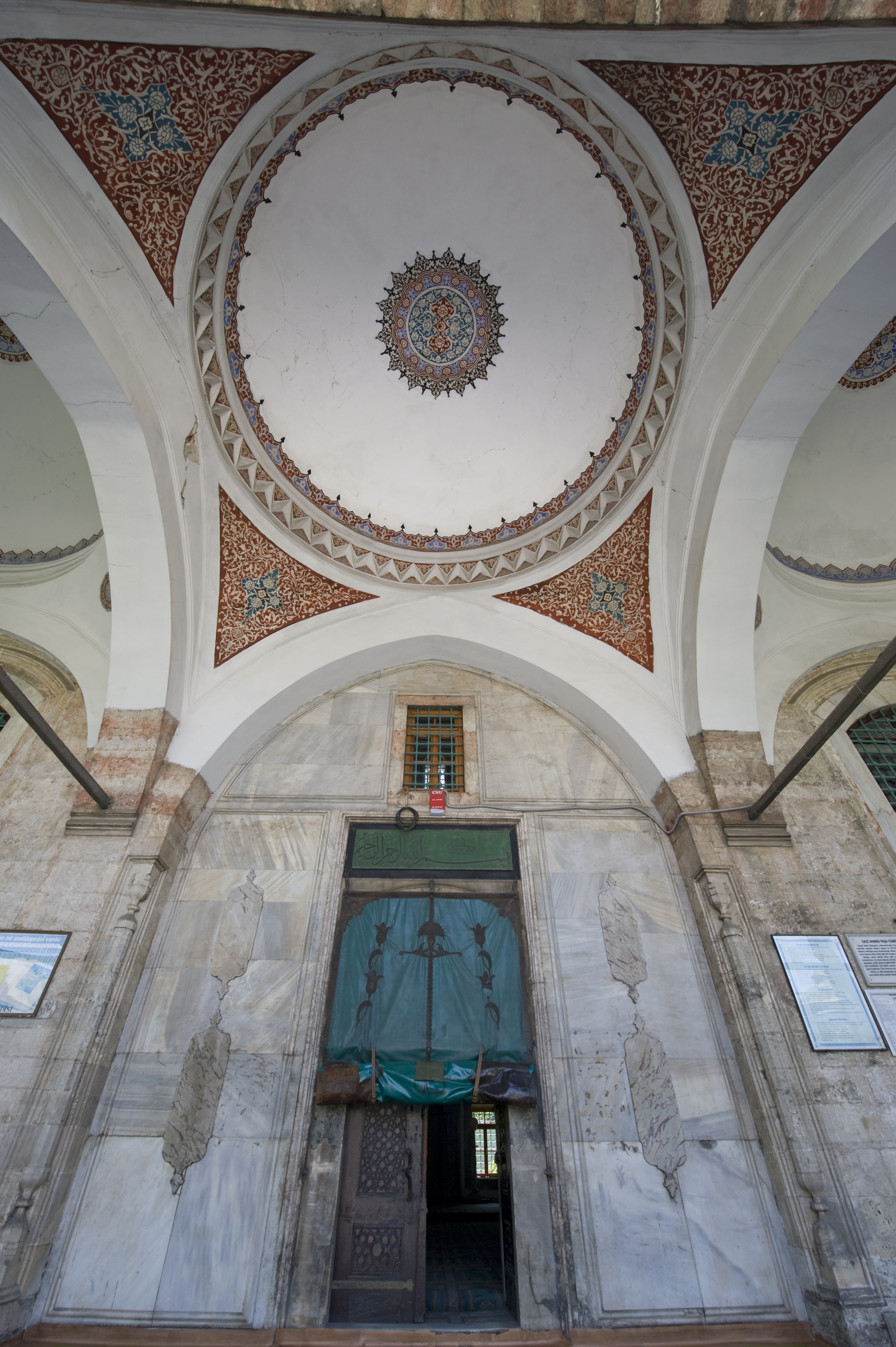
Portal from outside

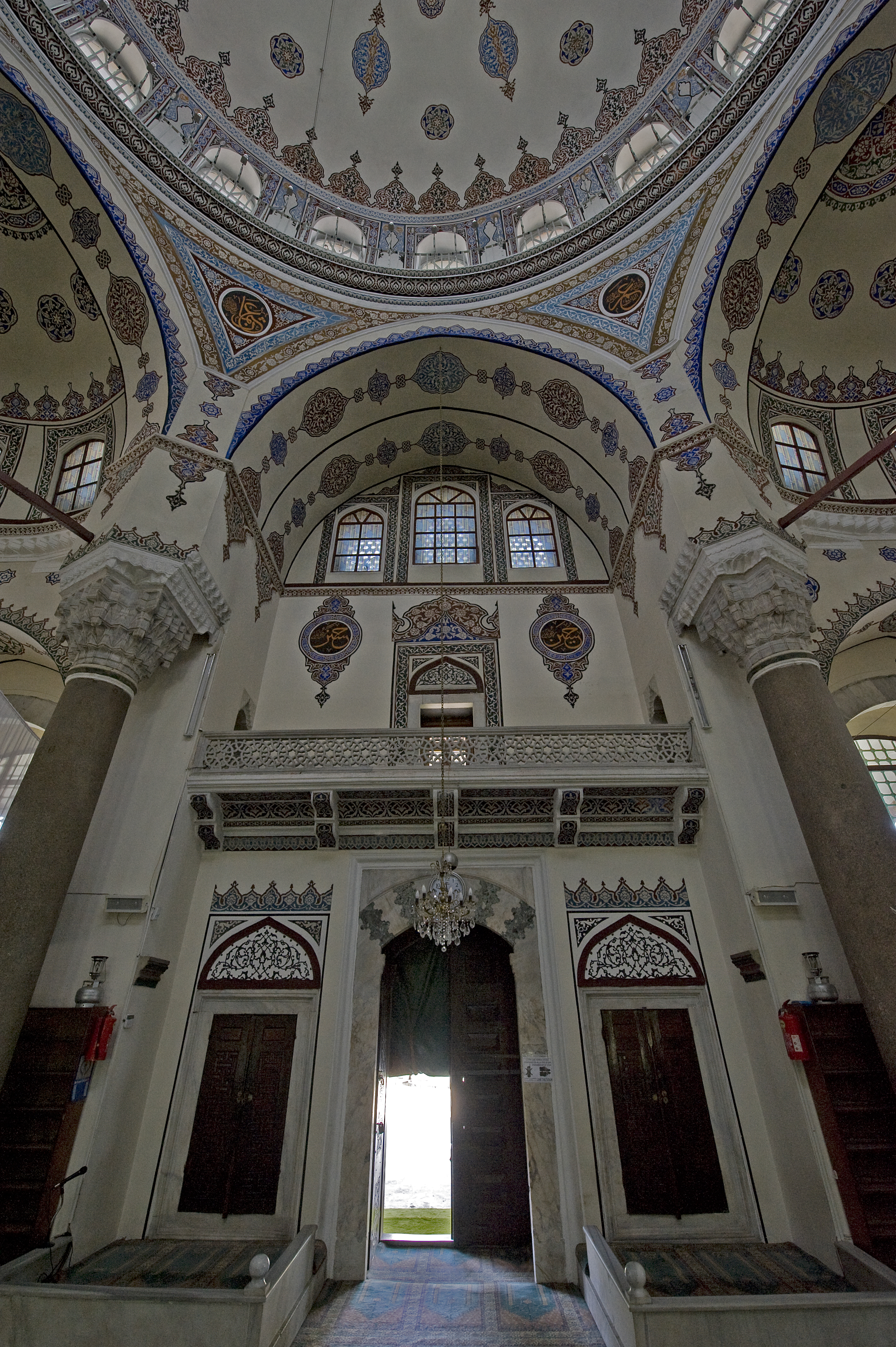
Portal from inside

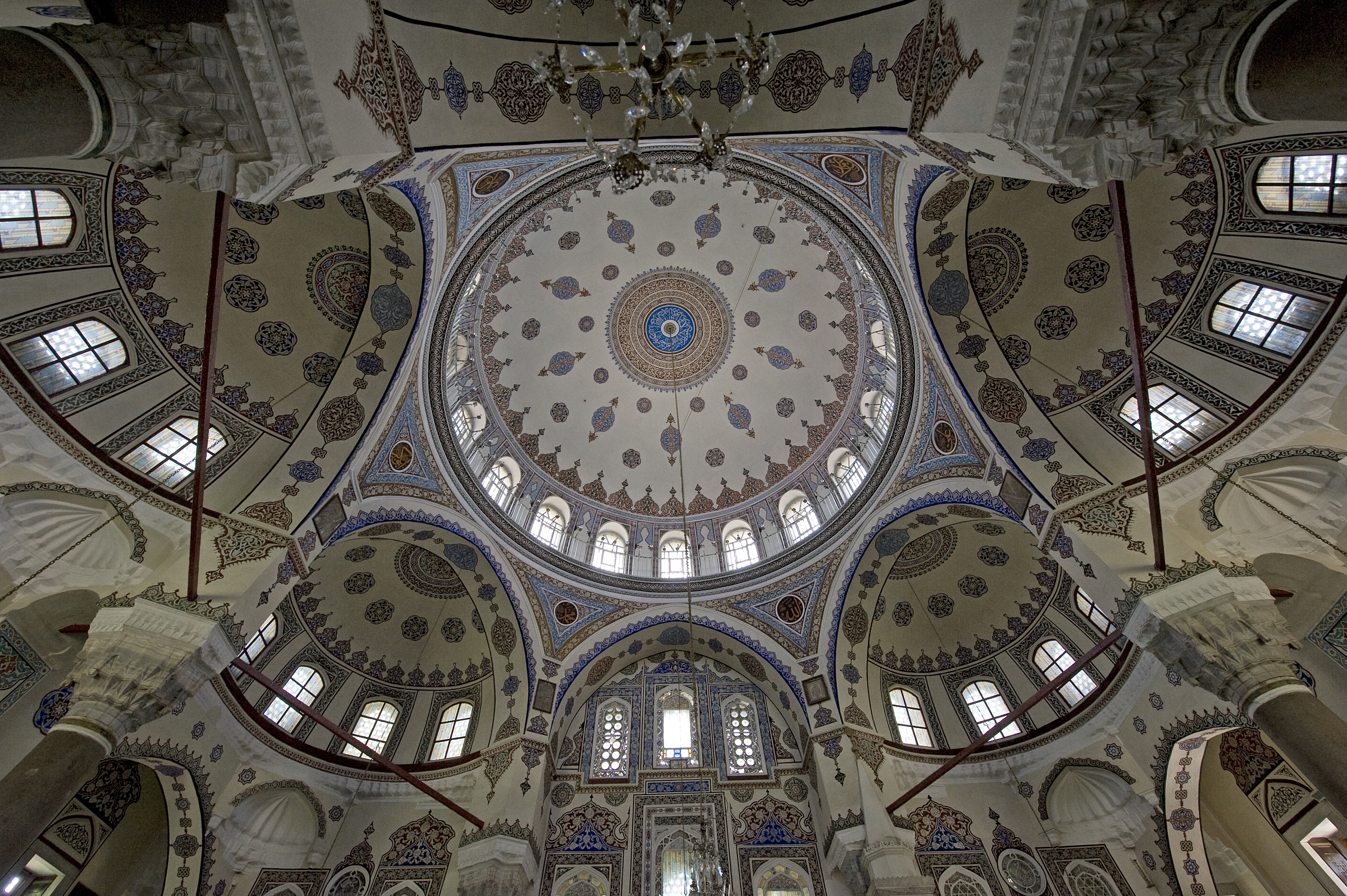
Main dome

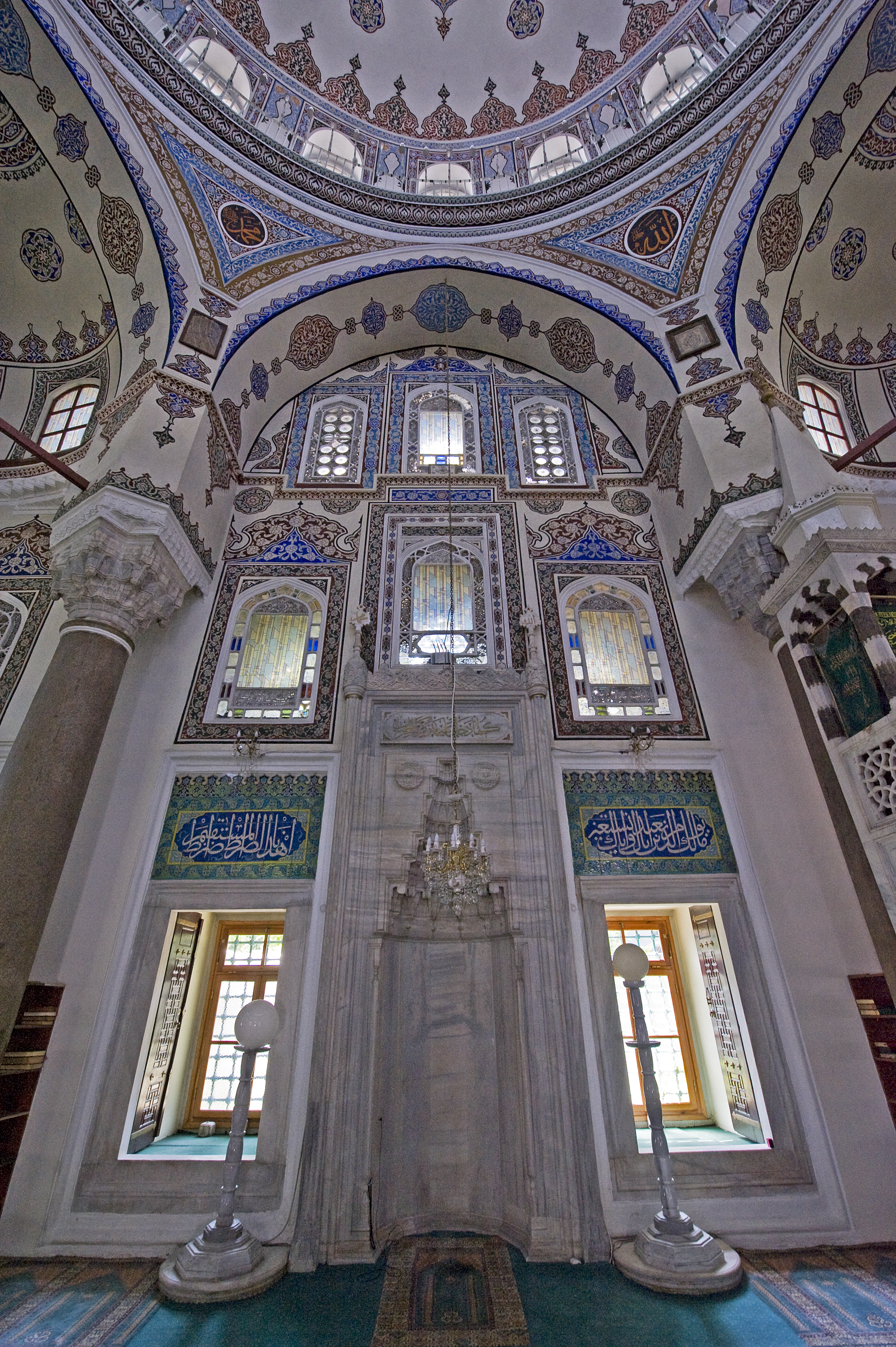
Mihrab

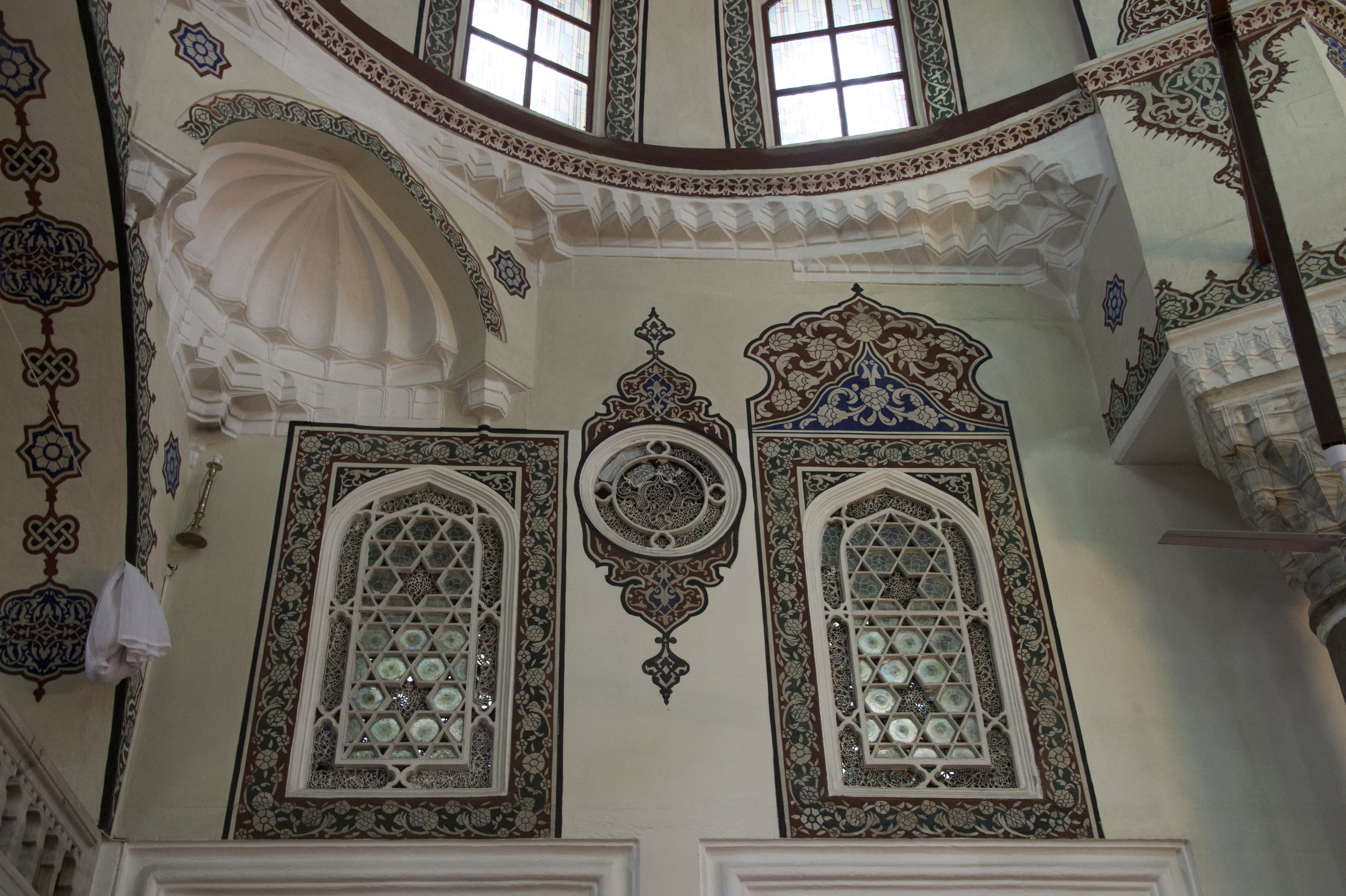
Conch under half-dome

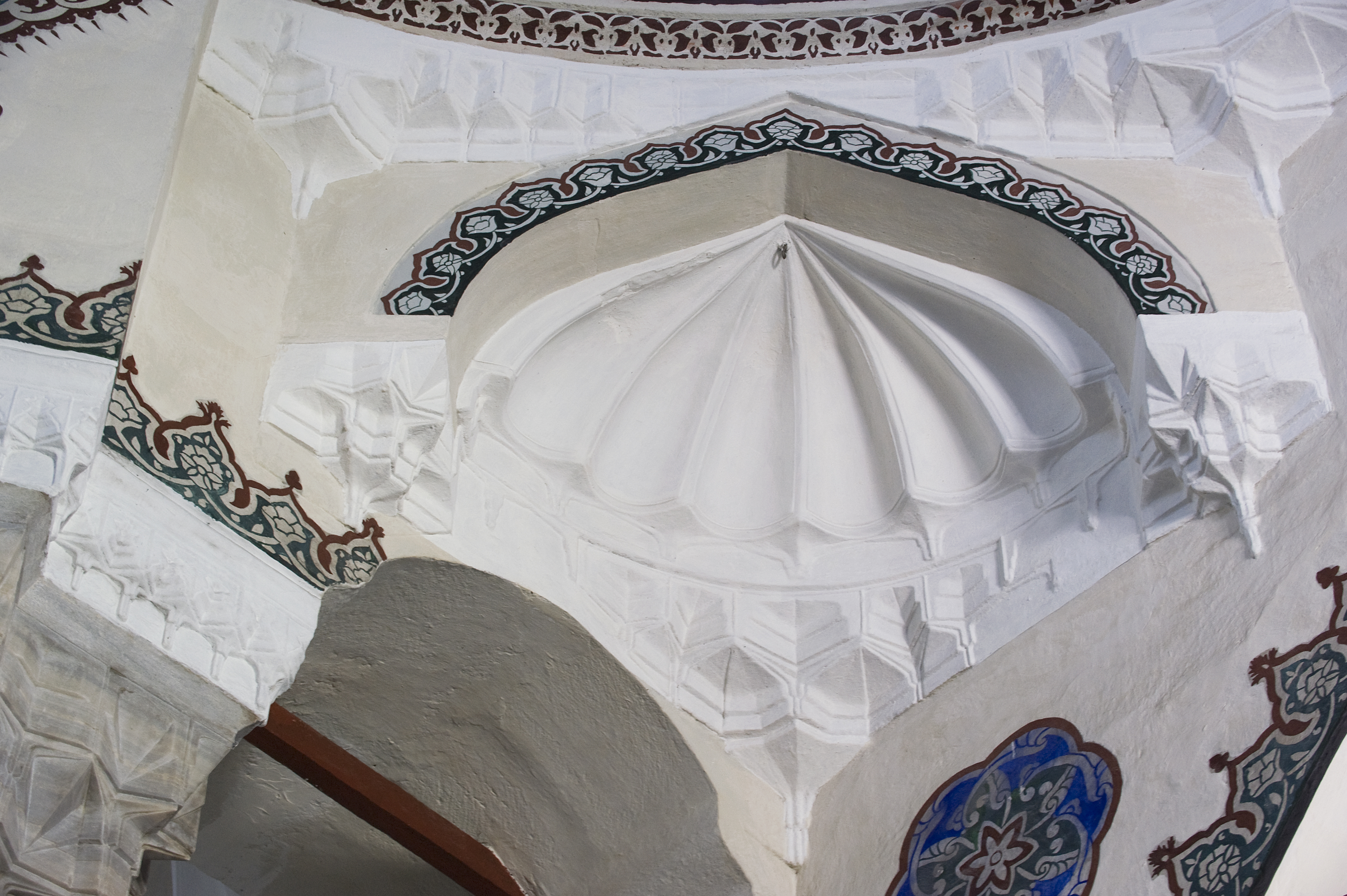
Conch

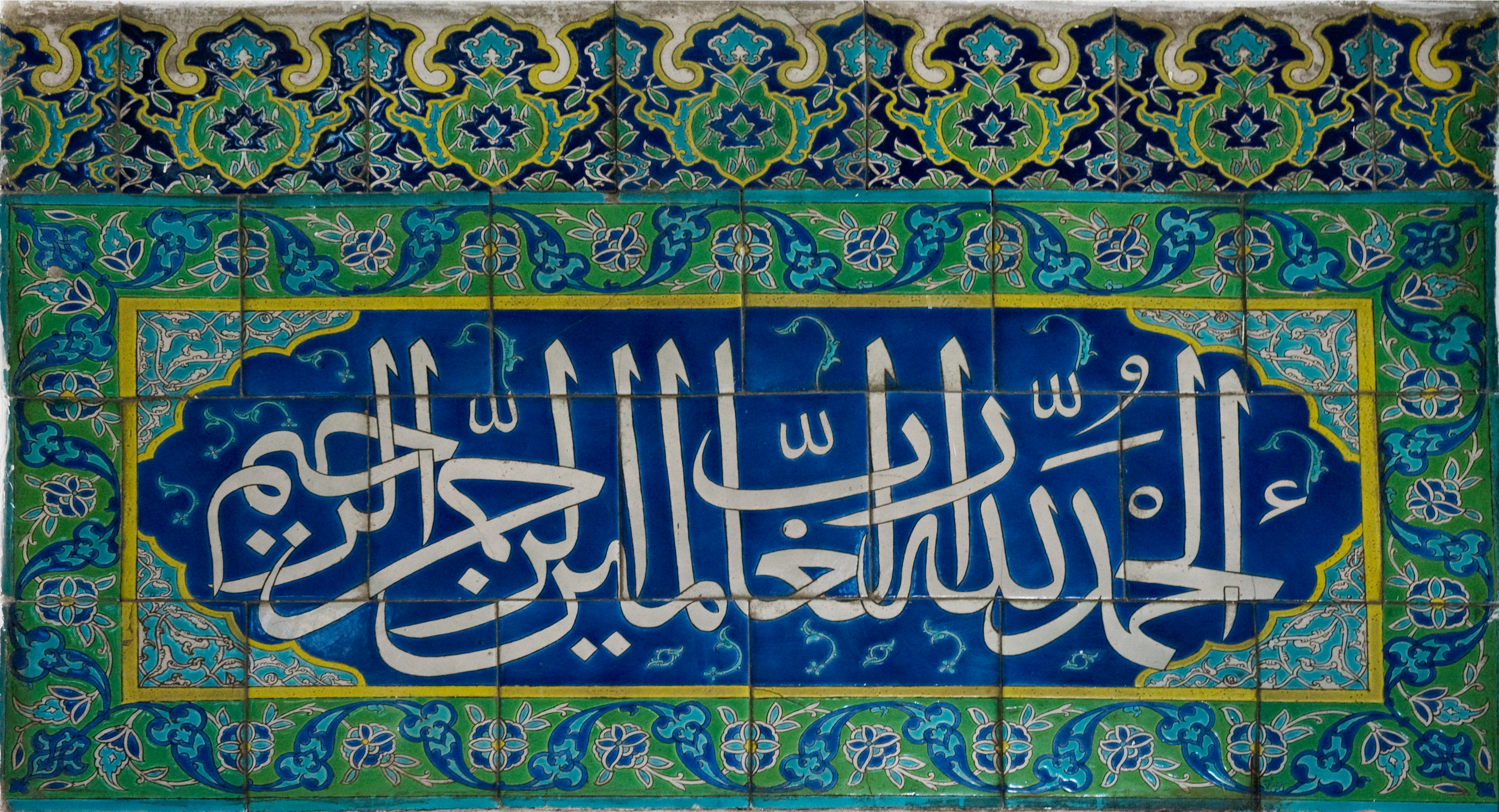
Lunette with Cuerda seca tiles above a window in the qibla wall

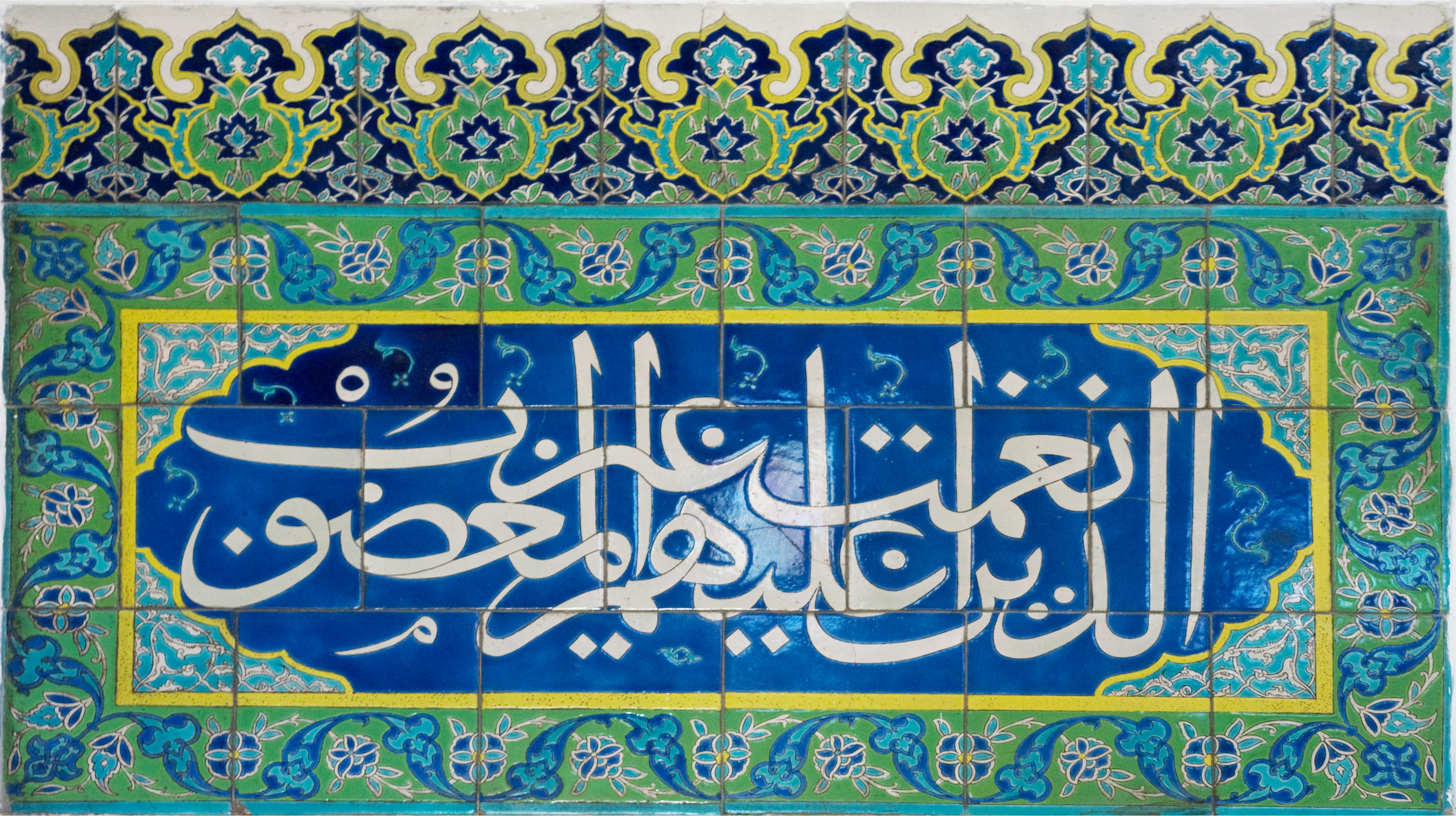
Lunette with Cuerda seca tiles above a window in the qibla wall

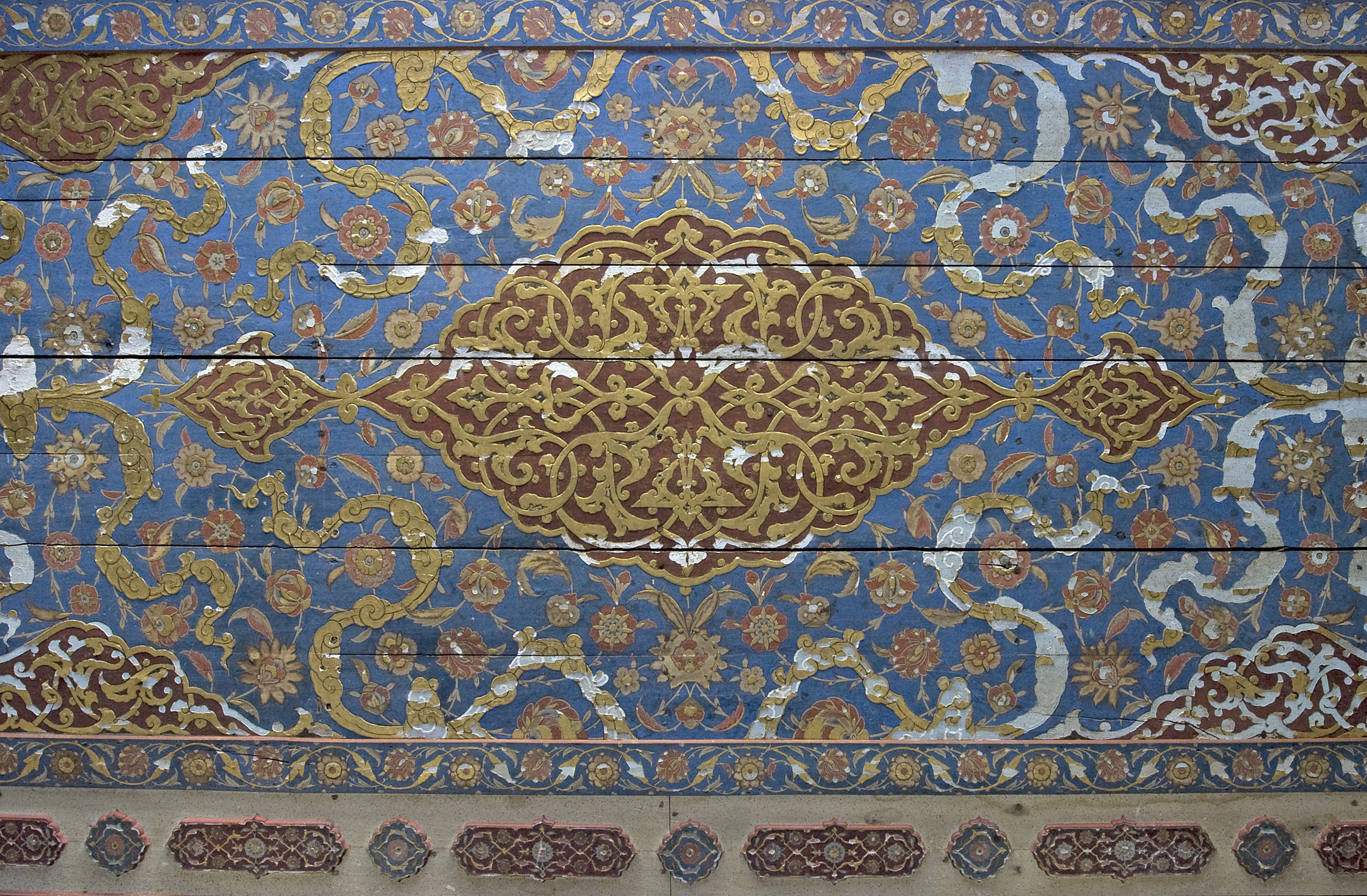
Painted ceiling on panels under the western galleries

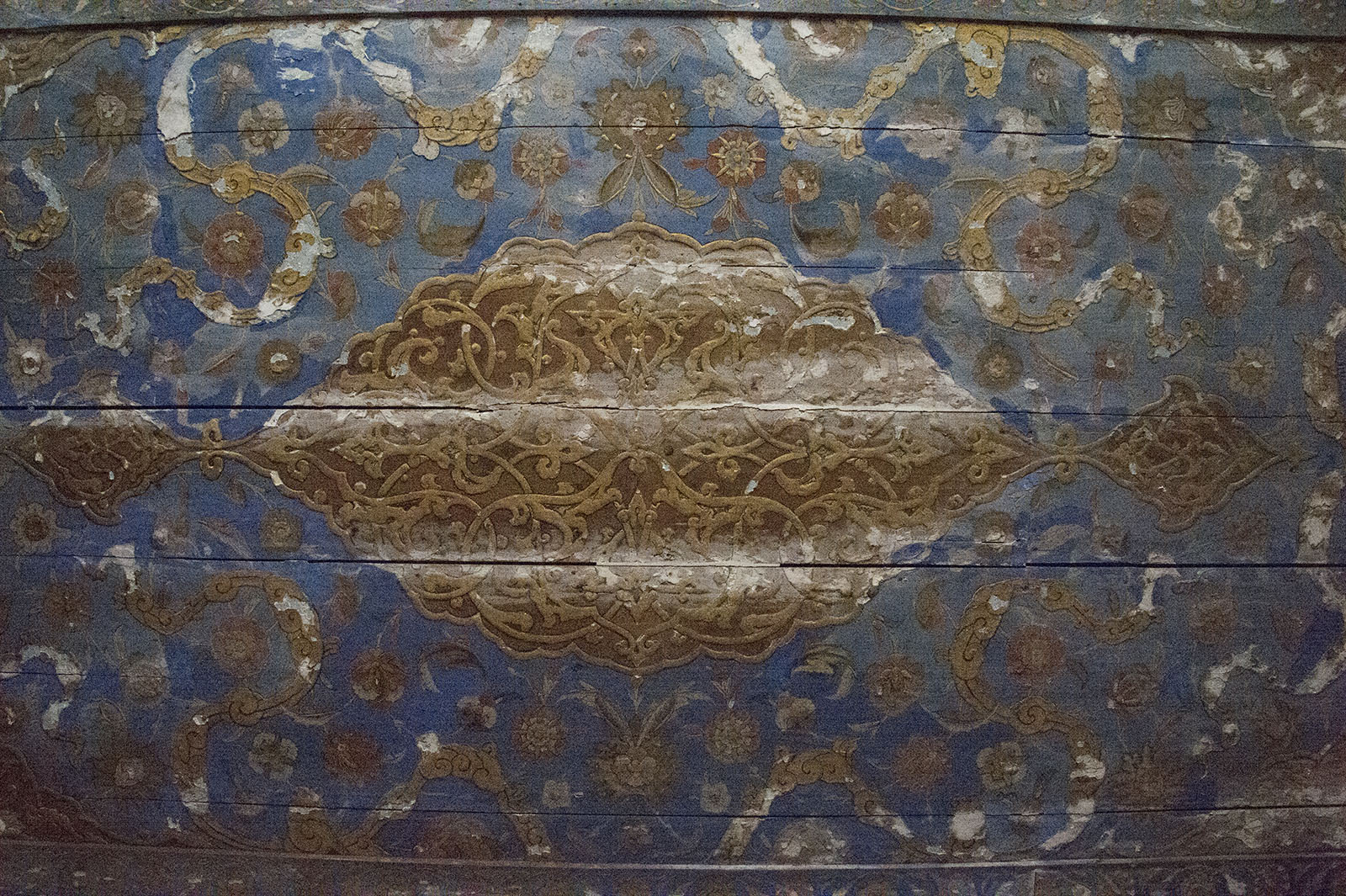
Painted ceiling on panels under the western galleries

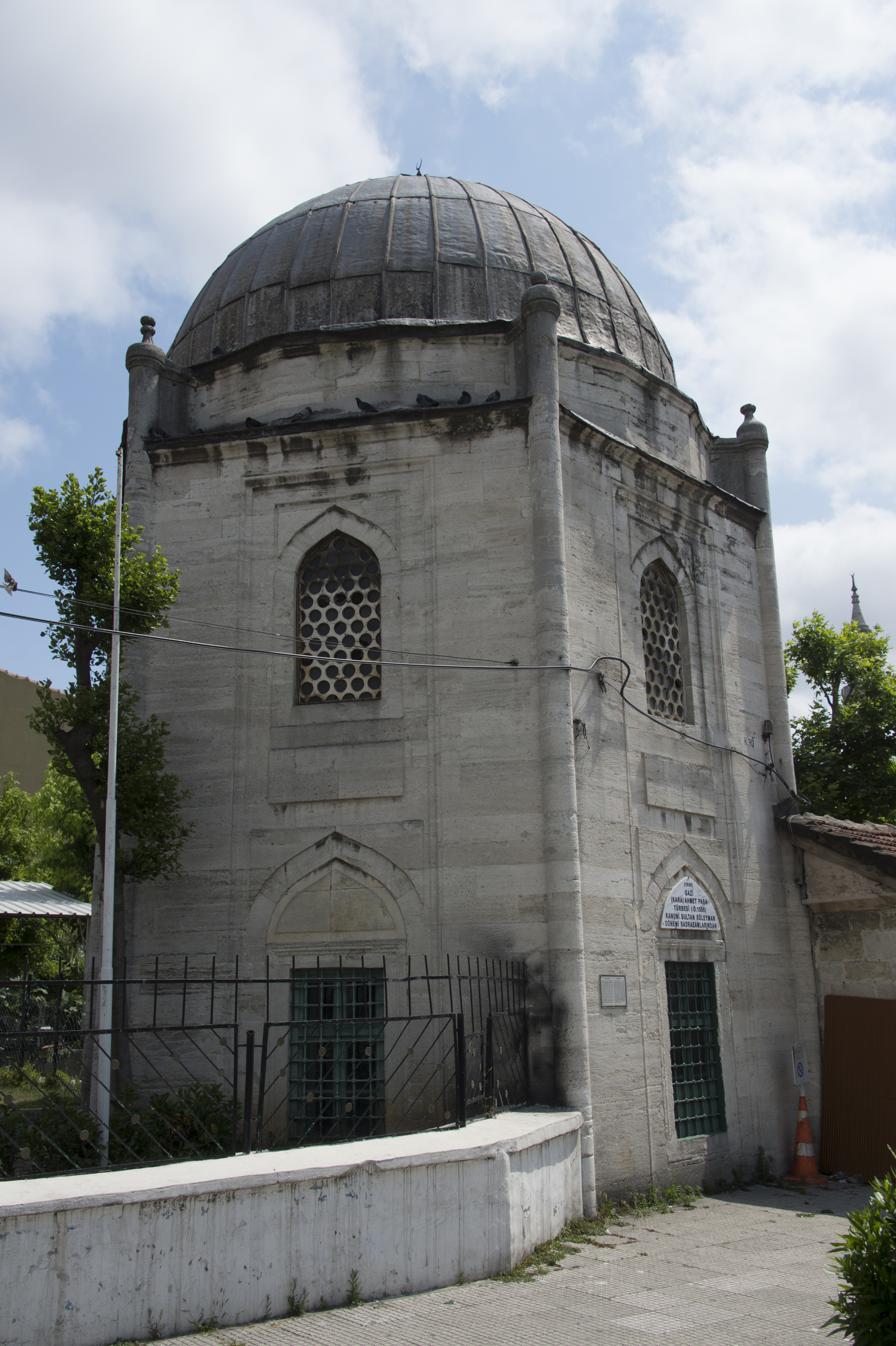
Mausoleum of Kara Ahmed Pasha

== See also ==
- List of Friday mosques designed by Mimar Sinan

== Sources ==
- Atasoy, Nurhan; Raby, Julian (1989). Iznik: The Pottery of Ottoman Turkey. London: Alexandra Press. ISBN 978-1-85669-054-6.
- Goodwin, Godfrey (2003) [1971]. A History of Ottoman Architecture. Thames and Hudson. ISBN 0-500-27429-0.
- Necipoğlu, Gülru (2005). The Age of Sinan: Architectural Culture in the Ottoman Empire. London: Reaktion Books. ISBN 978-1-86189-253-9.
