= Meltem Cumbul =

Turkish actress and TV personality

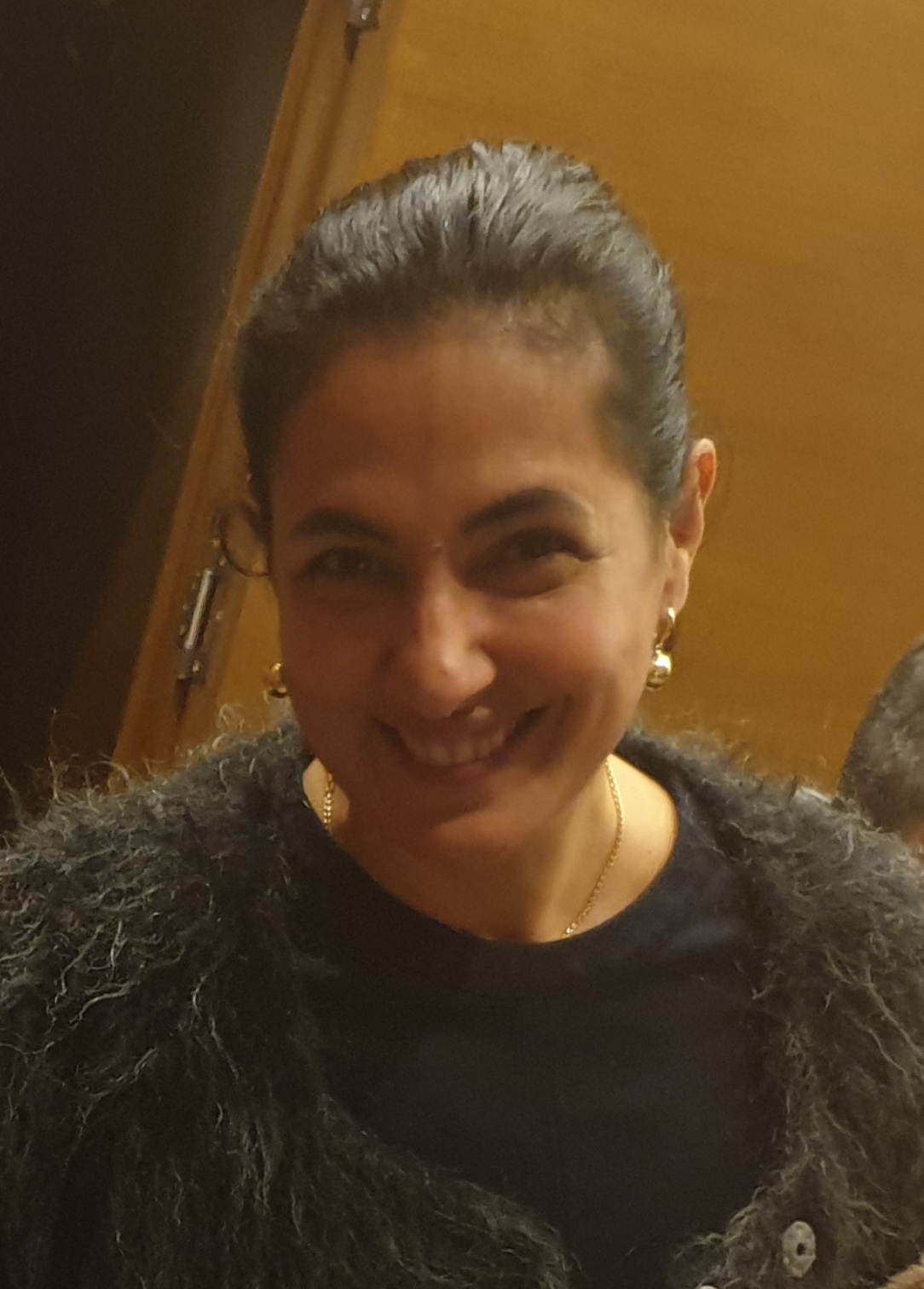
- Meltem Cumbul
- Born: 5 November 1969 (age 56); İzmir, Turkey
- Occupations: Actress, presenter
- Years active: 1994–present
- Spouses: Çağlayan Tuğal (m. 2003–2004) Alican Özbaş (m. 2012–2013)

Meltem Cumbul (born 5 November 1969) is a Turkish actress and acting teacher.

== Biography ==
Her family is of Circassian descent. Her aunt is Turkish folk music singer. Currently, Meltem Cumbul is teaching the acting method of Eric Morris, whom she studied with in Los Angeles for 3 years starting in 2005, at the Mimar Sinan Fine Arts University where she graduated from.

Between 1999-2001, Yılan Hikayesi, at one time the most successful and the most viewed TV series. With Olgun Şimşek, Erdal Özyağcılar, she played in comedy series "Beşik Kertmesi". She has played the role of Fatma Sultan in the historical drama Muhteşem Yüzyıl.

Meltem Cumbul's career encompasses 16 feature films including Berlinale Golden Bear winner Head-On movie. She played in film "Gönül Yarası" alongside veteran actor Şener Şen. She has also received awards from and participated on juries at many national and international awards at the festivals like Palm Springs, Queens, Ankara, and Antalya Golden Orange Film Festivals.

She performed in plays and musicals including Smokey Joe's Cafe and Taming of the Shrew.

== Credits ==
Film
Year	Title	Role	Notes
1994	Bir Sonbahar Hikayesi	Meltem Cumbul	
1995	Bay E		
1995	Böcek		
1997	Usta Beni Öldürsene	Katja	
1998	Karışık Pizza	Emel	
1999	Propaganda	Filiz	
1999	Doğum Yeri Absürdistan	Emine Dönmez	
1999	Duruşma	Nazan	2000 Ankara International Film Festival Best Actress Award
2001	Maruf	Cankız	
2003	Abdülhamit Düşerken	Nimet	2003 Golden Orange Best Actress Award
2004	Head-On	Selma	
2005	Gönül Yarası	Dünya	2006 FIPRESCI Best Actress Award
2008	The Alphabet Killer	Elisa Castillo	
2008	A Beautiful Life	Antanas	
2008	Mevlana Aşkı Dansı		Voice over
2009	Her Şeyin Bittiği Yerden		
2011	Tell Me O Kkhuda	Zainab Zardari	
2011	Labirent	Reyhan	
2014	Kadın İşi: Banka Soygunu	Gülay	
2015	Yaktın Beni	Leyla	
Television
Year	Title	Role	Notes
1995	Sahte Dünyalar	Nilgün Kılıç	
1995	Çiçek Taksi	Meltem Cumbul	
1996	Tatlı Kaçıklar	Meltem Cumbul	
1999–2001	Yılan Hikayesi	Zeynep	
2002	Beşik Kertmesi	Tekgül/Elmas Mağden	
2002	Biz Size Aşık Olduk	Reyhan	
2003	Gurbet Kadını	Elif	
2005	Avrupa Yakası		Guest appearance
2006	Arka Sokaklar		Guest appearance
2007	Parmaklıklar Ardında		Guest appearance
2007	Doktorlar		Guest appearance
2008	Aşk Yakar	Nazlı	
2011	Nuri	Leyla	
2013–2014	Muhteşem Yüzyıl	Fatma Sultan	
2021–	Kırmızı Oda	Pembe	Guest starring

=== Talk shows ===
- 1993 Rifle King Kong Show, Kanal 6
- 1994 Nereden Başlasak Nasıl Anlatsak, Kanal D
- 1995 Kolaysa Sen de Gel, ATV
- 1997 Meltem Cumbul Show, Kanal 6

=== Music ===
- 1999 "Seninleyim" (single) (NR1 Müzik)

== See also ==
- List of Eurovision Song Contest presenters

== Notes ==
Preceded by (Latvia) Marie N & Renārs Kaupers	Eurovision Song Contest presenter 2004 (with Korhan Abay)	Succeeded by (Ukraine) Maria Efrosinina & Pavlo Shylko
Preceded by Meral Oğuz	Golden Orange Award for Best Actress; 2003 for Abdülhamit Düşerken	Succeeded by Tülin Özen
