= Hadim Ibrahim Pasha =

Ottoman politician

Hadim Ibrahim Pasha (Turkish: Hadım Ibrahim Paşa, meaning in English "Ibrahim Pasha the Eunuch") (1473 – 1563) was a 16th-century Ottoman statesman of Bosnian origin.

== Life ==
Born in the Sanjak of Bosnia, he became Chief White Eunuch of the Topkapı Palace Harem under Sultan Suleyman the Magnificent. He was appointed Governor of Anatolia, and in 1544 was nominated fourth Vizier. In 1548–9, during the Second campaign of the Ottoman-Safavid War, he got the position of lieutenant Governor of Constantinople, reaching the rank of third Vizier. Appointed second Vizier in 1553, after the assassination of the crown prince Şehzade Mustafa on behalf of the Sultan, he was sent by Suleyman - then stationing in Aleppo - to Bursa to strangle the sons of Mustafa. Appointed again lieutenant Governor of the Capital from 1553 to 1555, after the comeback of the Sultan to Constantinople he was forced to retire because of his old age. Ibrahim Pasha died in 1562. He followed a modest lifestyle and was among the few Court Eunuchs who enjoined unanimously a high reputation. In 1562, he married Fatma Sultan, a daughter of Sultan Selim I and full-sister of Sultan Süleyman I, but he died shortly after, in 1563.

== Legacy ==
In 1551 he commissioned Court Architect (Turkish: Mimar) Sinan to erect his funerary mosque in Constantinople, in the neighborhood of the Gate of Silivri (Turkish: Silivrikapı). On January 21, 1562, he established an endowment (Turkish: Waqf), which was entitled to administer several institutions in the western part of Constantinople. These were: his Friday mosque with an elementary school in the Silivrikapı neighborhood; another school near Silivrikapı; a Byzantine church which he had converted into a mosque, with an attached medrese and an elementary school (also erected by Sinan) near the Isakapı Gate; another elementary school near the Column of Arcadius and a water well for travellers outside Yenikapı Gate. The endowment was to be financed through villages donated by the Sultan, fields, shops and mills in Rumelia, and buildings in Edirne and Constantinople. The Waqf was administered by the Chief white eunuch of Topkapi. The location of these establishments in sparsely settled neighborhoods along the Walls, where the population was predominantly Christian, shows his desire of pursuing a policy of Islamization of the city.

== Sources ==
- Müller-Wiener, Wolfgang (1977). Bildlexikon zur Topographie Istanbuls: Byzantion, Konstantinupolis, Istanbul bis zum Beginn d. 17 Jh (in German). Tübingen: Wasmuth. ISBN 978-3-8030-1022-3.
- Necipoĝlu, Gulru (2005). The Age of Sinan: Architectural Culture in the Ottoman Empire. London: Reaktion Books. ISBN 978-1-86189-244-7.
