= Fatma Sultan (daughter of Selim I) =

Ottoman princess, daughter of Sultan Selim I

- Born: ante 1494; Trabzon, Ottoman Empire
- Died: c. 1566; Bursa, Ottoman Empire
- Burial: Kara Ahmed Pasha Türbe
- Spouse: Mustafa Pasha (m. 1516; div. 1520) Kara Ahmed Pasha (m. 1522; died 1555) Hadim Ibrahim Pasha (m. 1562; died 1563)
- Issue: Second marriage Two daughters (?)
- Dynasty: Ottoman
- Father: Selim I
- Mother: Hafsa Sultan
- Religion: Sunni Islam

Fatma Sultan (Ottoman Turkish: فاطمہ سلطان; ante 1494 – c. 1566) was an Ottoman princess, daughter of Selim I and Hafsa Sultan, and a sister of Sultan Suleiman the Magnificent.

== Biography ==
She was first married in 1516 to Mustafa Pasha, governor of Antakya; however they divorced when it turned out that he was homosexual and had no interest in her. In a letter written to her father, she expresses her distress. She complains that her husband's open display of homosexual tendencies deeply offends her, saying, "My royal padishah, I have not smiled for one day, for one hour since my coming here one year ago... I am going mad as if I were a widow. My royal sultan, my dearest dad, my state cannot be expressed with a pen".

Then, she married in 1522 to Kara Ahmed Pasha, who was the Grand Vizier of the Ottoman Empire between 1553 and 1555, and maybe they had two daughters. After his execution, she went to live in Bursa or, according to other sources, was forcibly married in 1562 to Hadim Ibrahim Pasha, presumably as a punishment for her intrigues. However, it turned out to be the happiest of all her marriages.

Fatma commissioned a mosque in Topkapı, near the mosque of her husband Ahmed Pasha, where she is buried when she died, around 1566. In 1575 Murad III build the "Fatma Sultan Mosque" in honor of his great-aunt.

== Depictions in literature and popular culture ==
In the TV series Muhteşem Yüzyıl, Fatma Sultan is played by Turkish actress Meltem Cumbul.

== See also ==
- Ottoman Empire
- Ottoman dynasty
- Ottoman family tree
- Ottoman Emperors family tree (simplified)
