= Hadim Ibrahim Pasha Mosque =

Ottoman mosque in Silivrikapi, Istanbul, Turkey

- Hadım İbrahim Paşa Camii
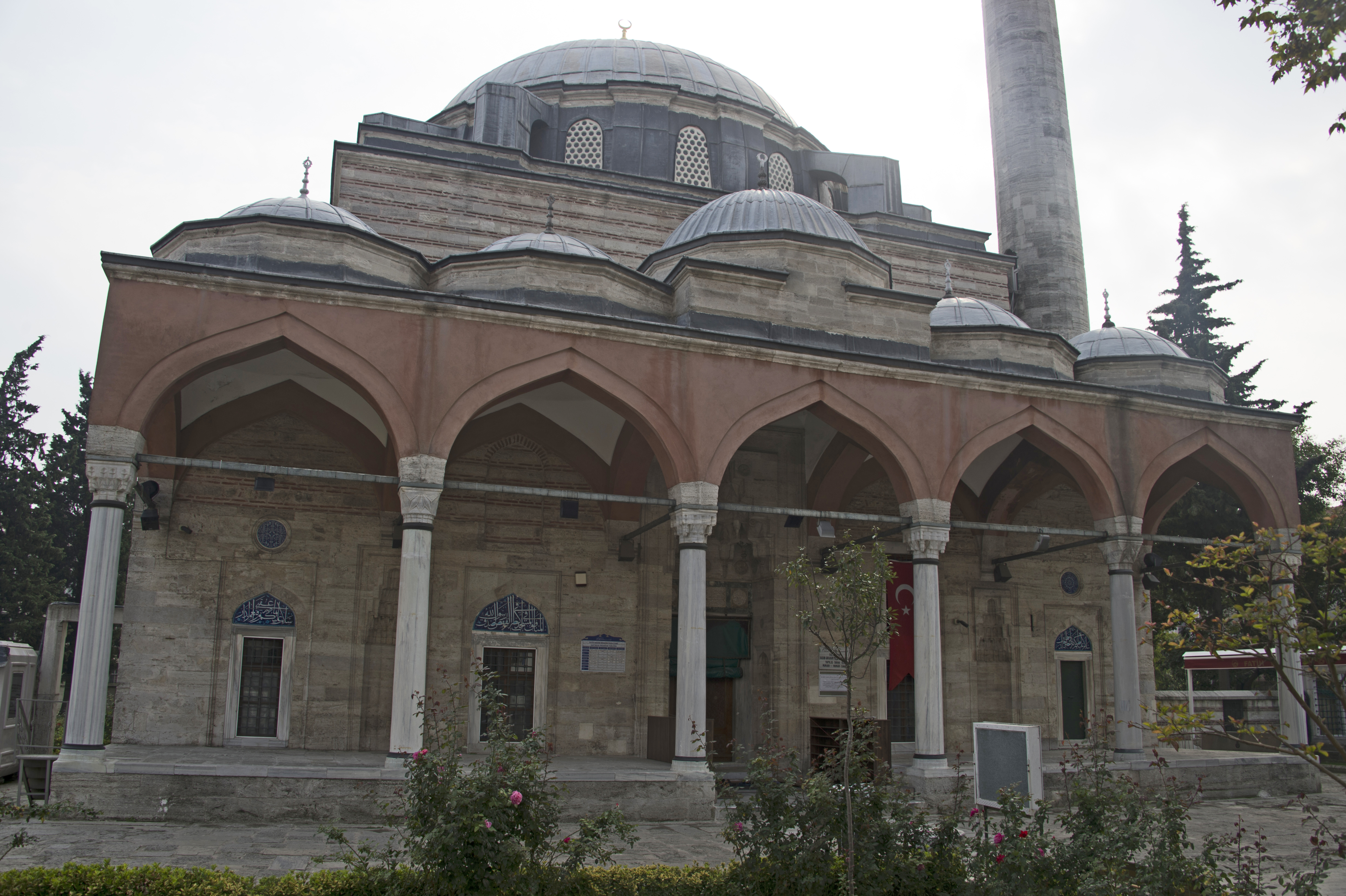

- Shown within the Fatih district of Istanbul

Religion
- Affiliation: Islam

Location
- Location: Istanbul, Turkey
- Interactive map of Hadim Ibrahim Pasha Mosque
- Coordinates: 41°00′21.6″N 28°55′21.7″E

Architecture
- Architect: Mimar Sinan
- Type: Mosque
- Style: Ottoman
- Completed: 1551

Specifications
- Dome dia. (inner): 12 m
- Minaret: 1

The Hadim Ibrahim Pasha Mosque (Turkish: Hadım İbrahim Paşa Camii) is a 16th-century Ottoman mosque located in the Silivrikapi neighborhood of Istanbul, Turkey.

== History ==
The Hadim Ibrahim Pasha Mosque was designed by Ottoman imperial architect Mimar Sinan for the Bosniak vizier Hadim (Eunuch) Ibrahim Pasha. The building was completed in 1551.

== Architecture ==
The mosque is in the form of a domed cube with an attached portico. The main dome has a diameter of 12 metres (39 feet) and is supported by eight internal buttresses. There are three tiers of windows. The five small domes of the portico are supported by arches with marble columns. The stone minaret, on the southwest end of the portico, was rebuilt in 1763–64. The mosque is similar in design to the earlier Bali Pasha Mosque in the Yenibahçe district of Istanbul which was completed in 1504–05.

The mosque is decorated with a number of panels in coloured Iznik tiles. Under the portico on the north façade are three lunette panels and two roundels. The underglaze painted tiled panels have white thuluth lettering reserved on a dark cobalt blue background. Between the letters are flowers in purple and turquoise. Above the mihrab is a larger lunette panel painted in cobalt blue, turquoise and dark olive green. The purple colouring is characteristic of the 'Damascus' style of Iznik pottery but is unusual on tiles. The panels help establish the chronology of the different styles adopted by the Iznik potters.

== Gallery ==
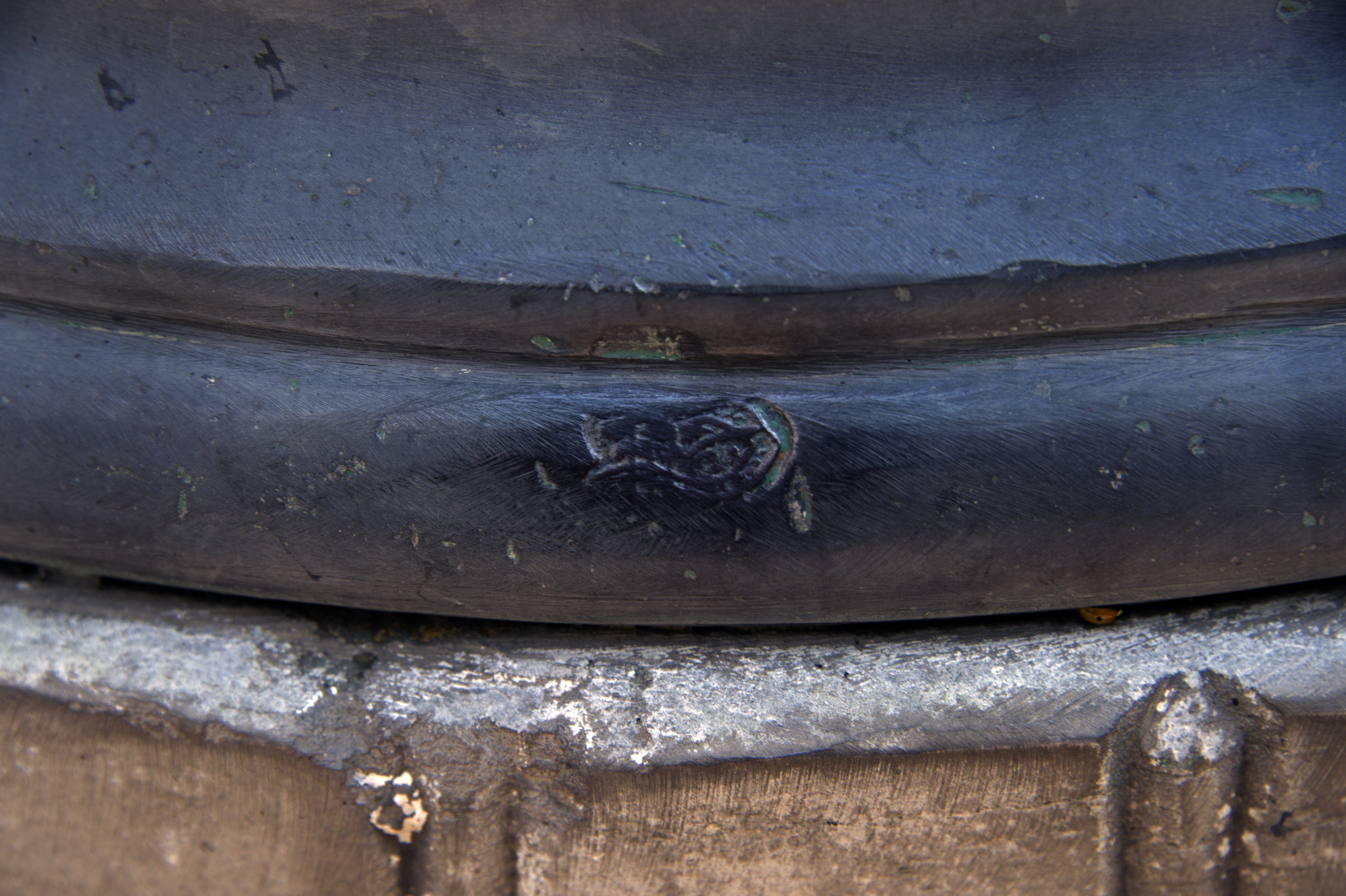
Hadim Ibrahim Pasha Mosque with the mark of Mimar Sinan on a pillar

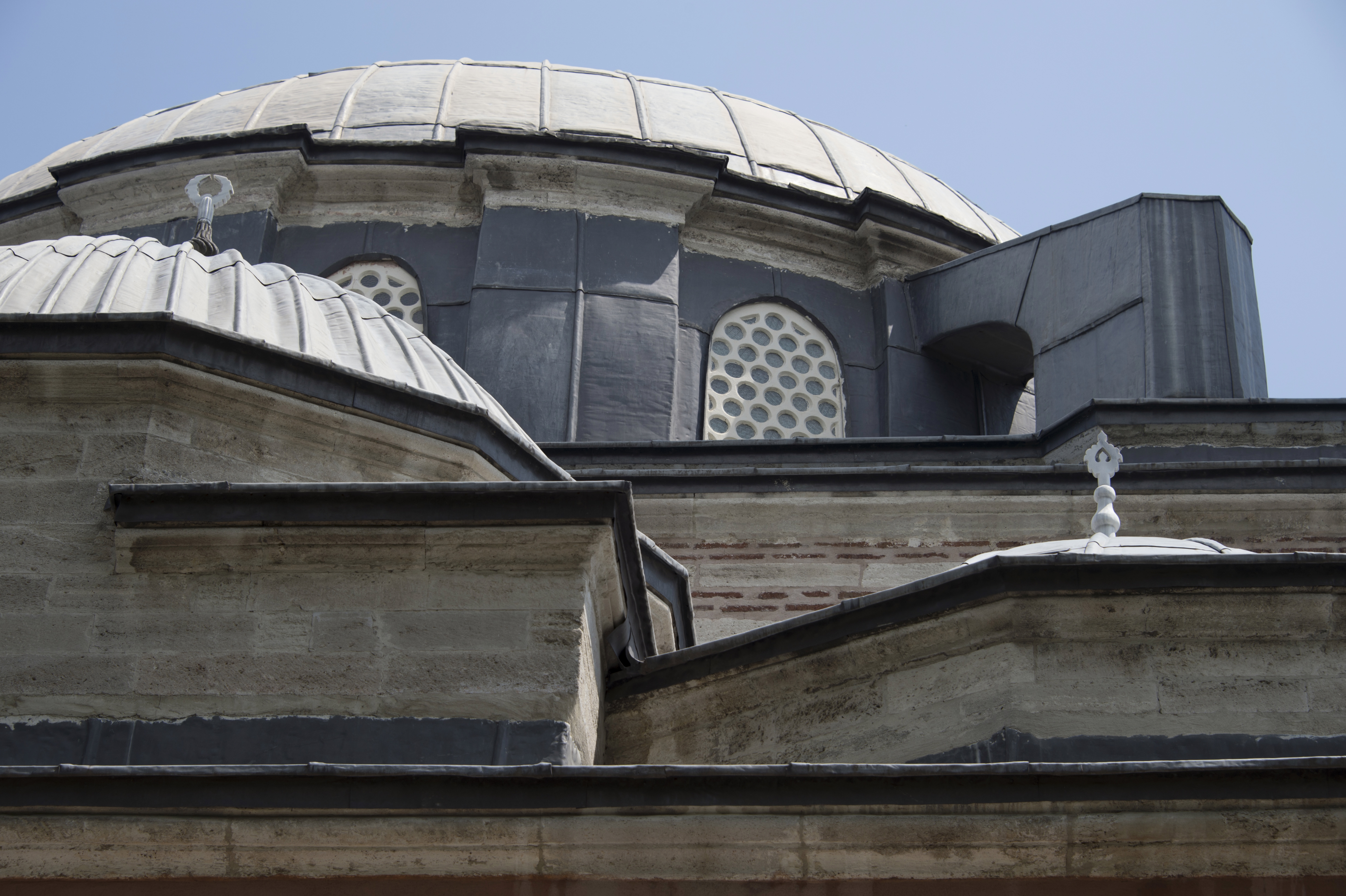
Hadim Ibrahim Mosque exterior dome

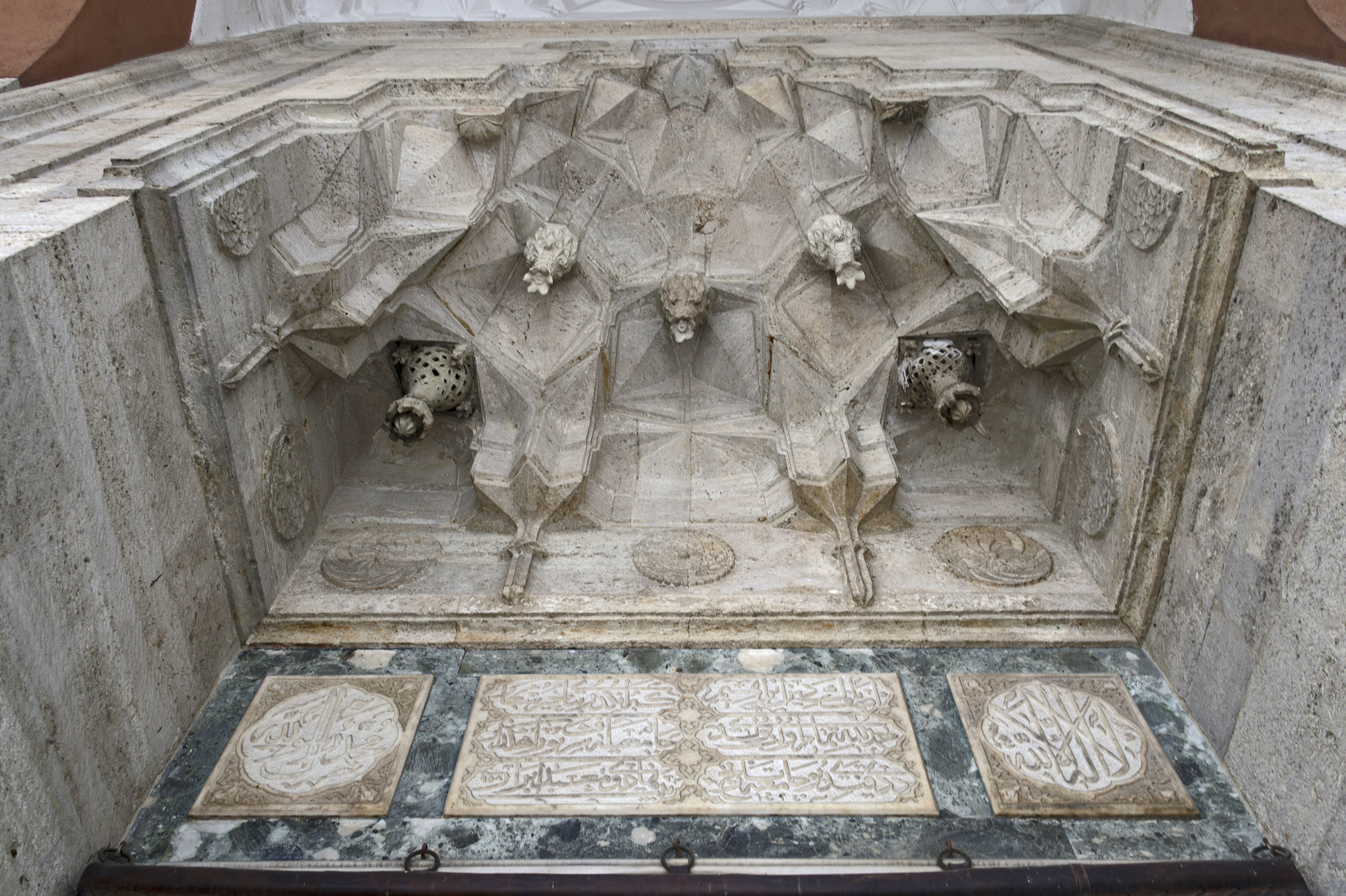
Hadim Ibrahim Mosque muqarnas above the portal

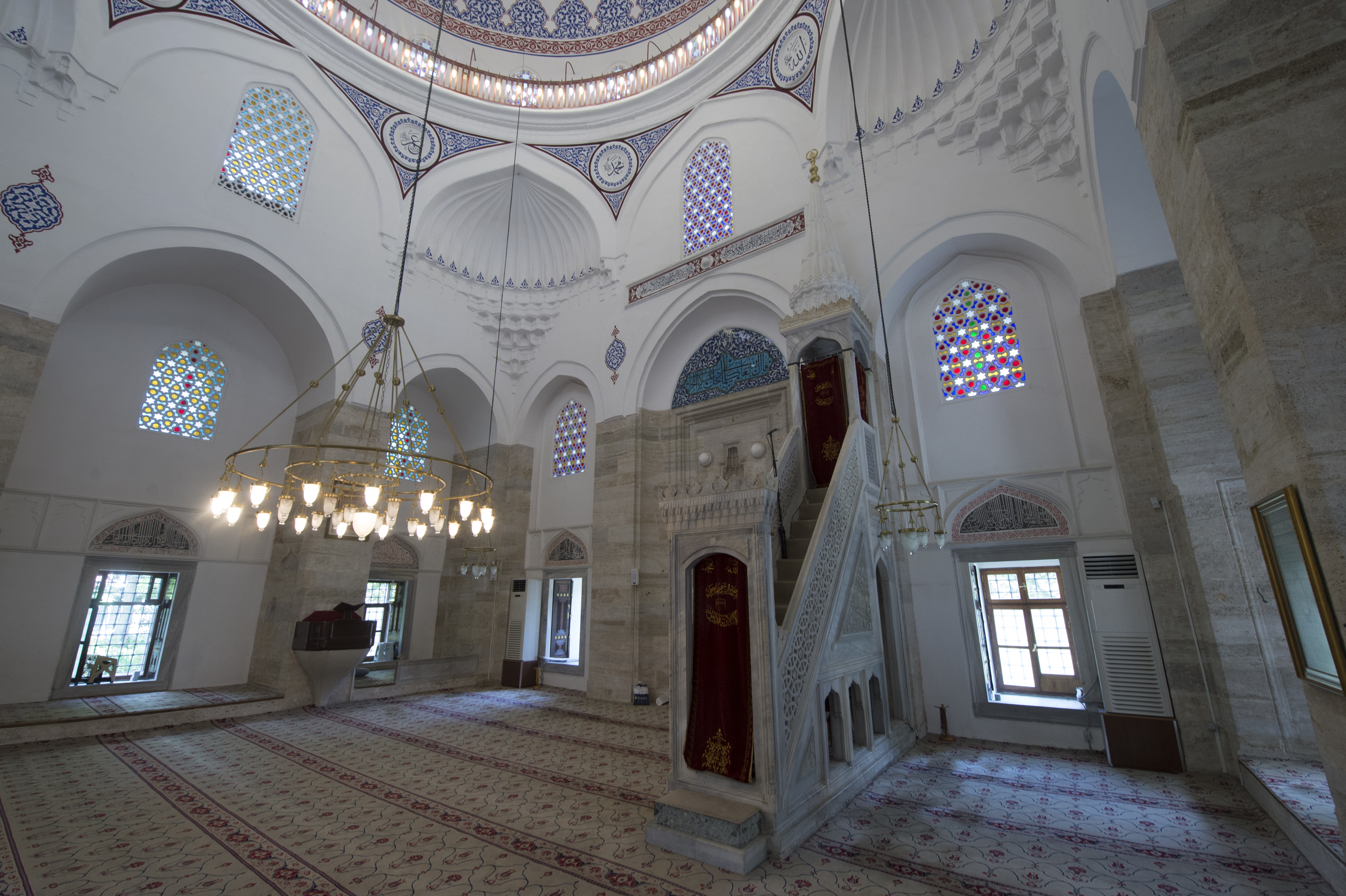
Hadim Ibrahim Mosque view towards the minbar

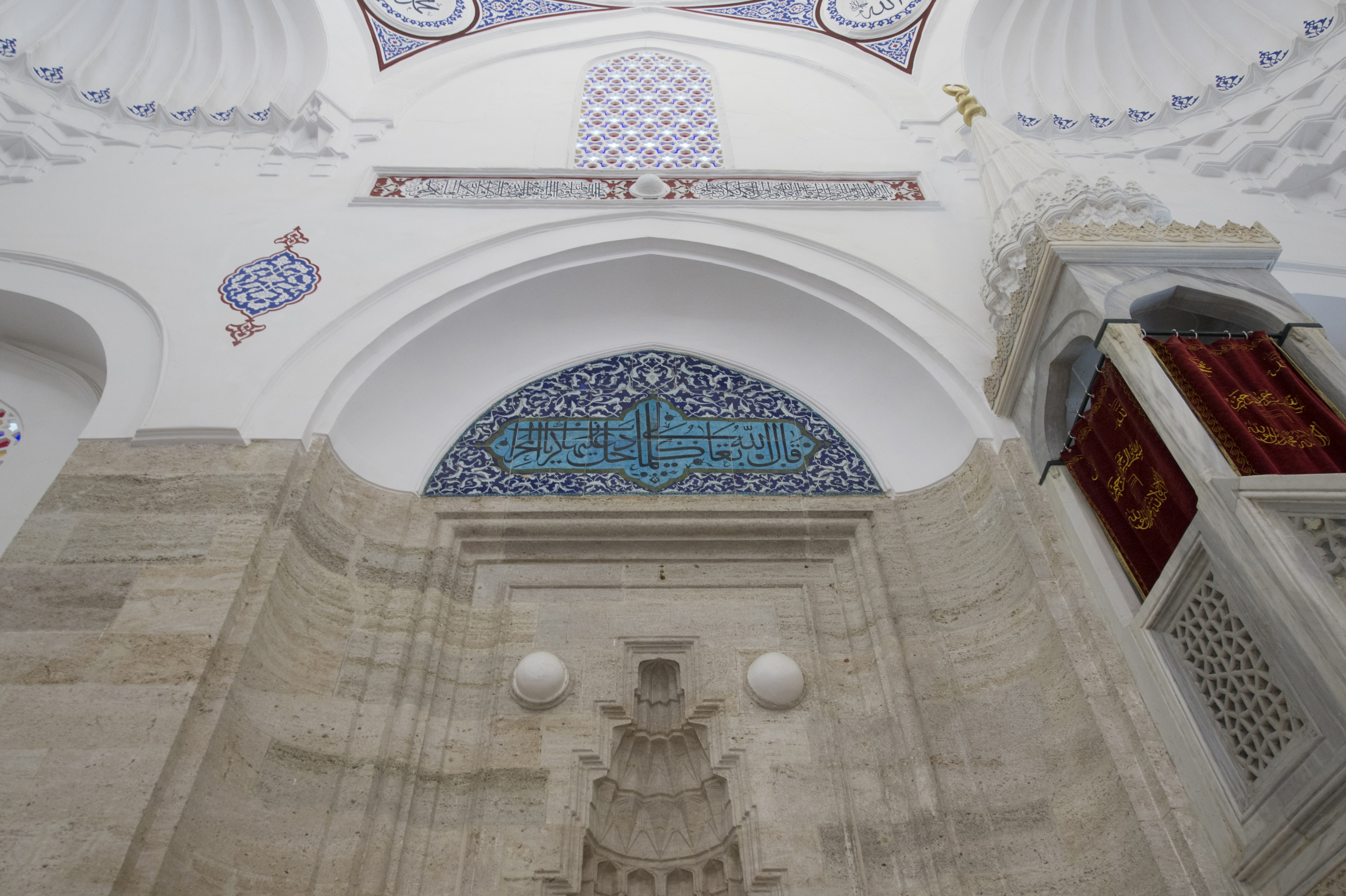
Hadim Ibrahim Mosque view on top of the mihrab

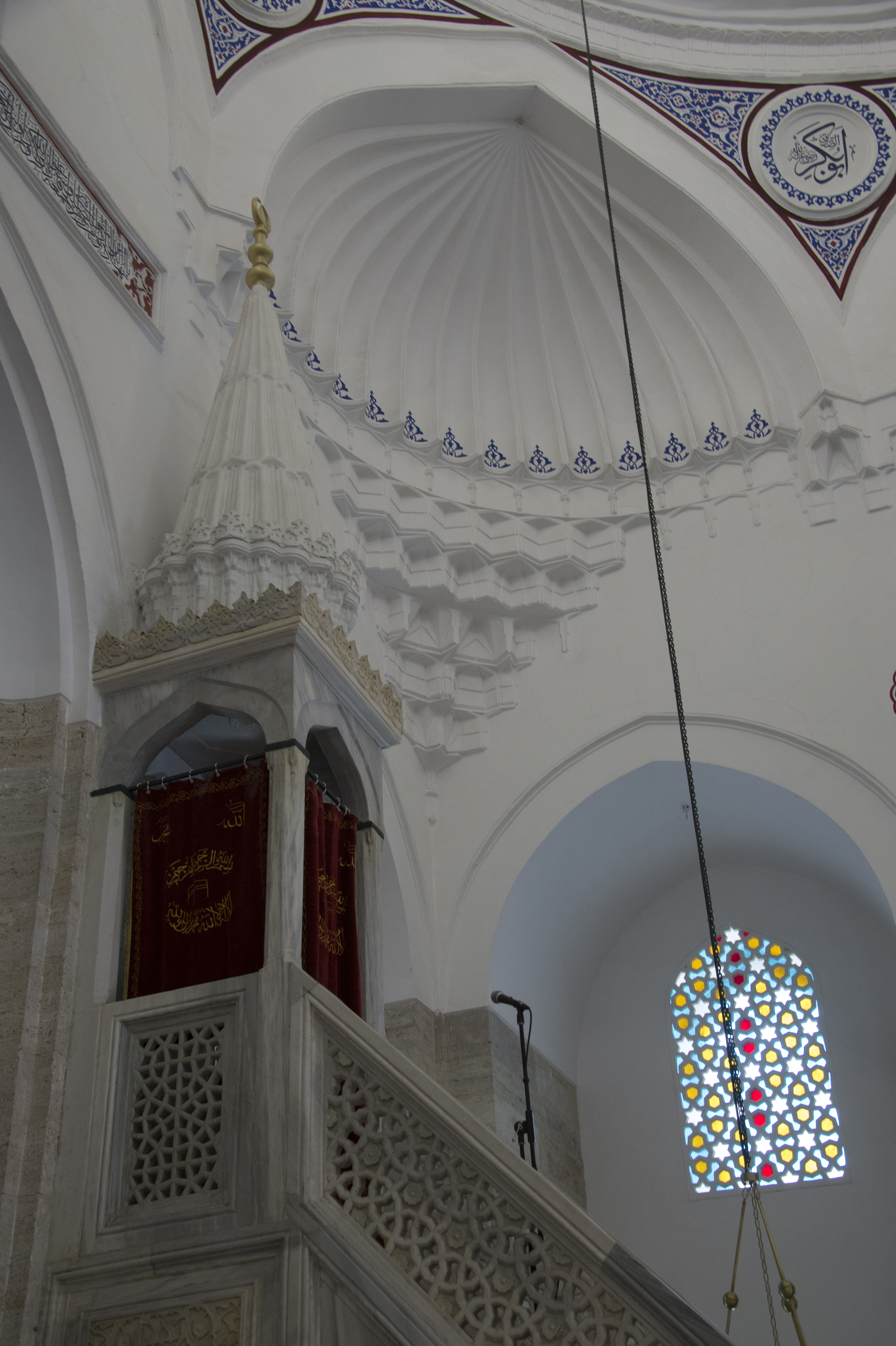
Hadim Ibrahim Mosque view of the top of the minbar, and squinch with muqarnas and perforated lines inlaid

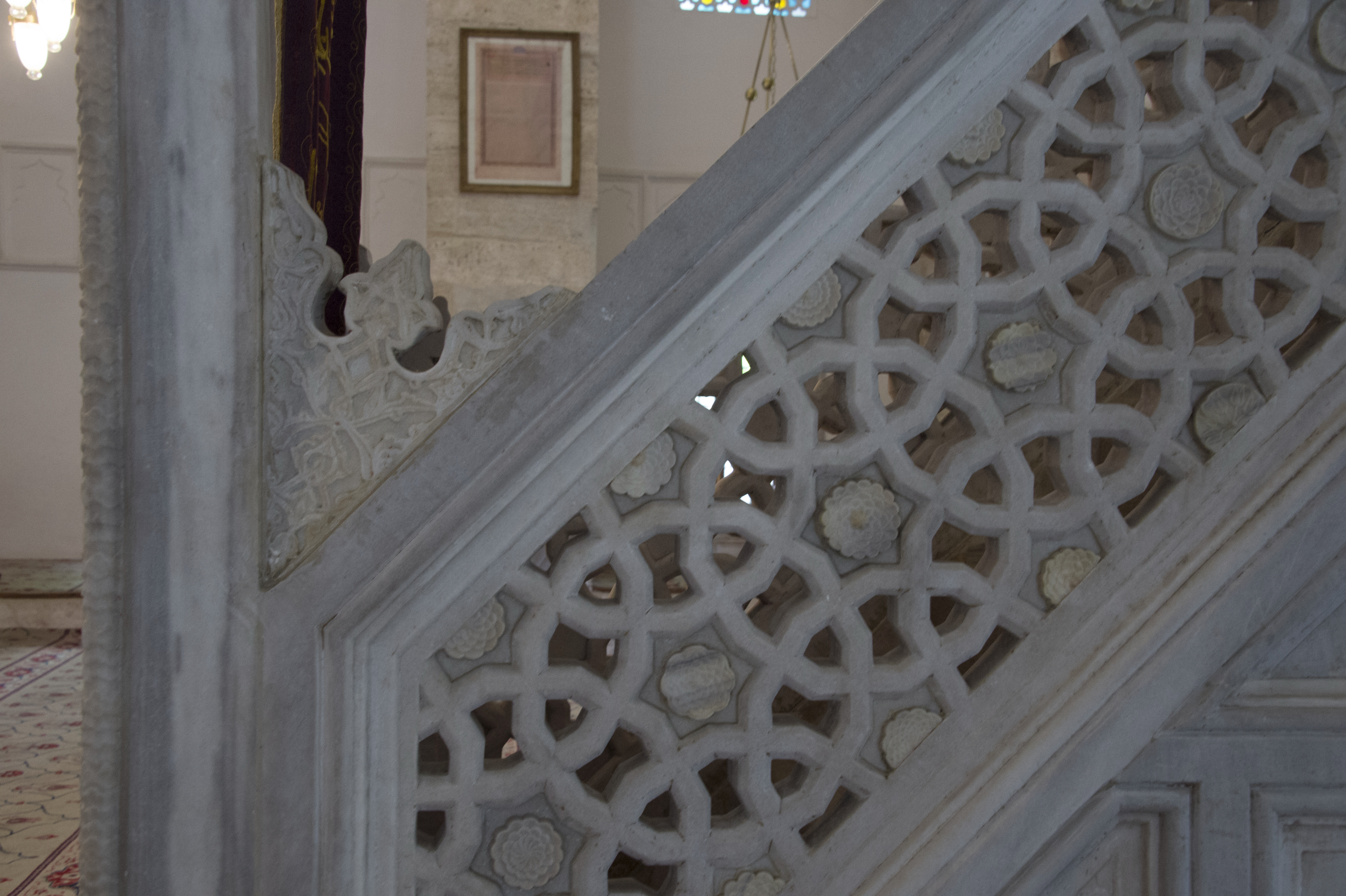
Hadim Ibrahim Pasha Mosque minbar on the side

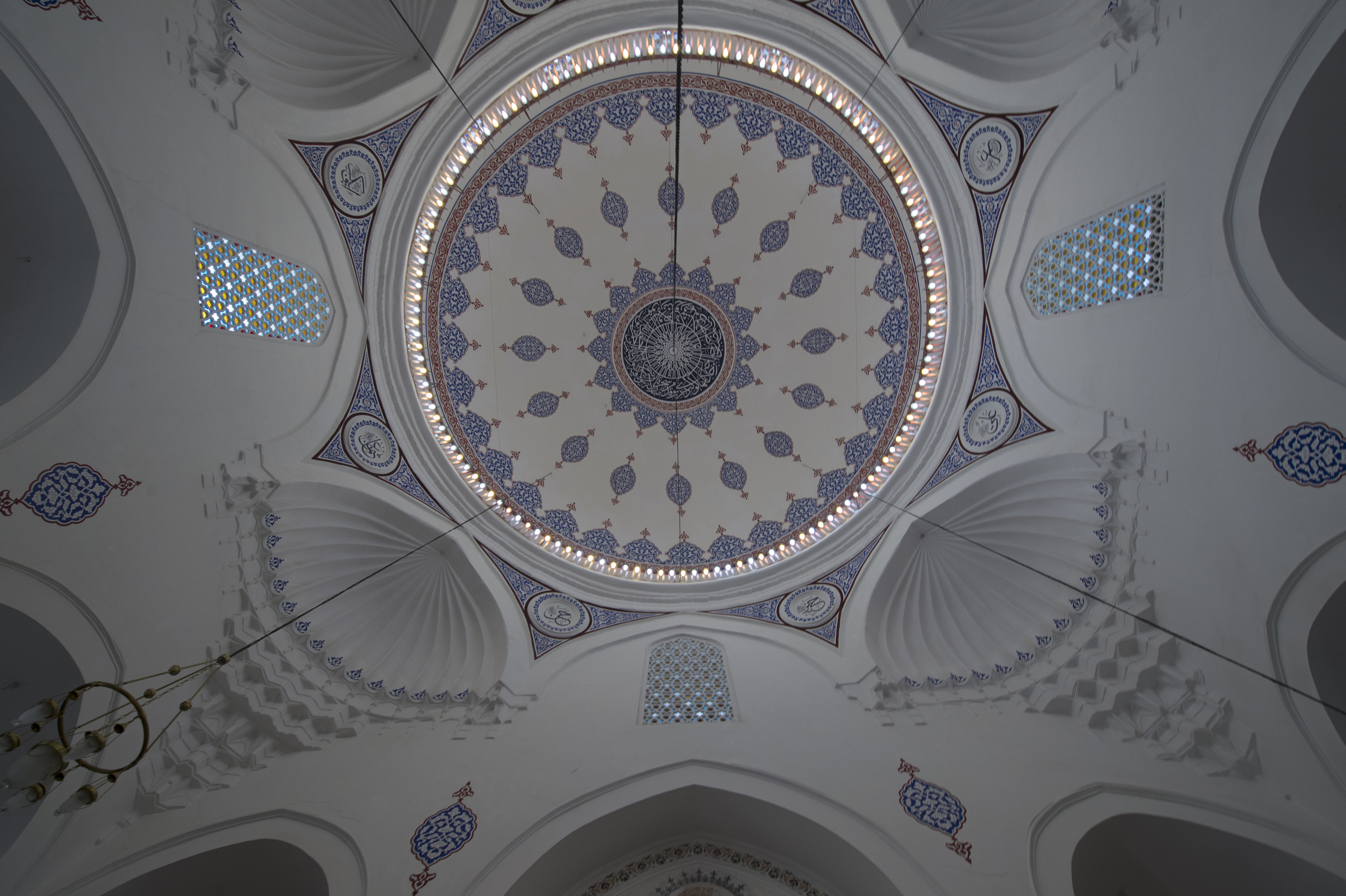
Hadim Ibrahim Mosque interior domes

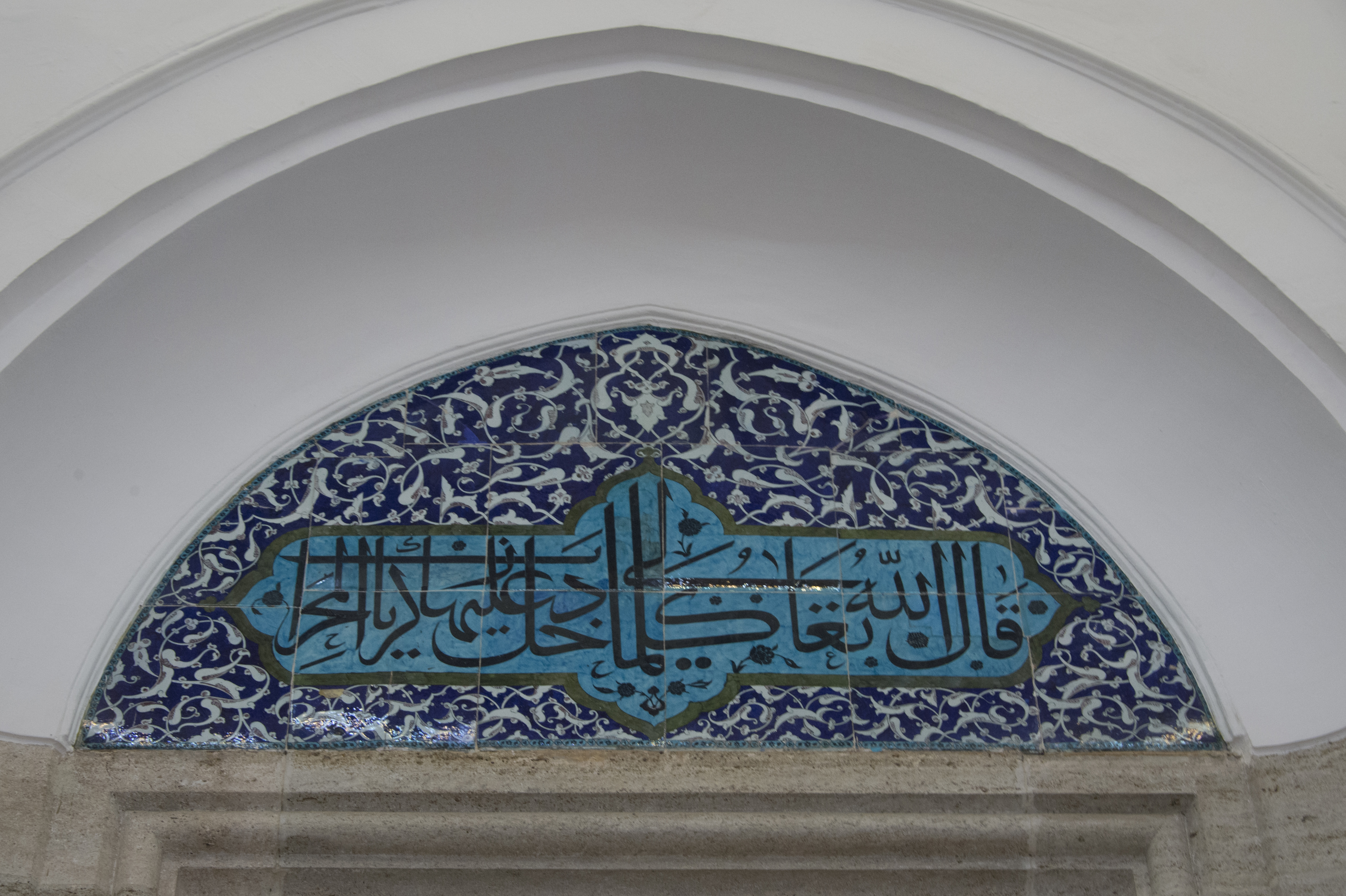
Hadim Ibrahim Mosque Islamic calligraphy above a window

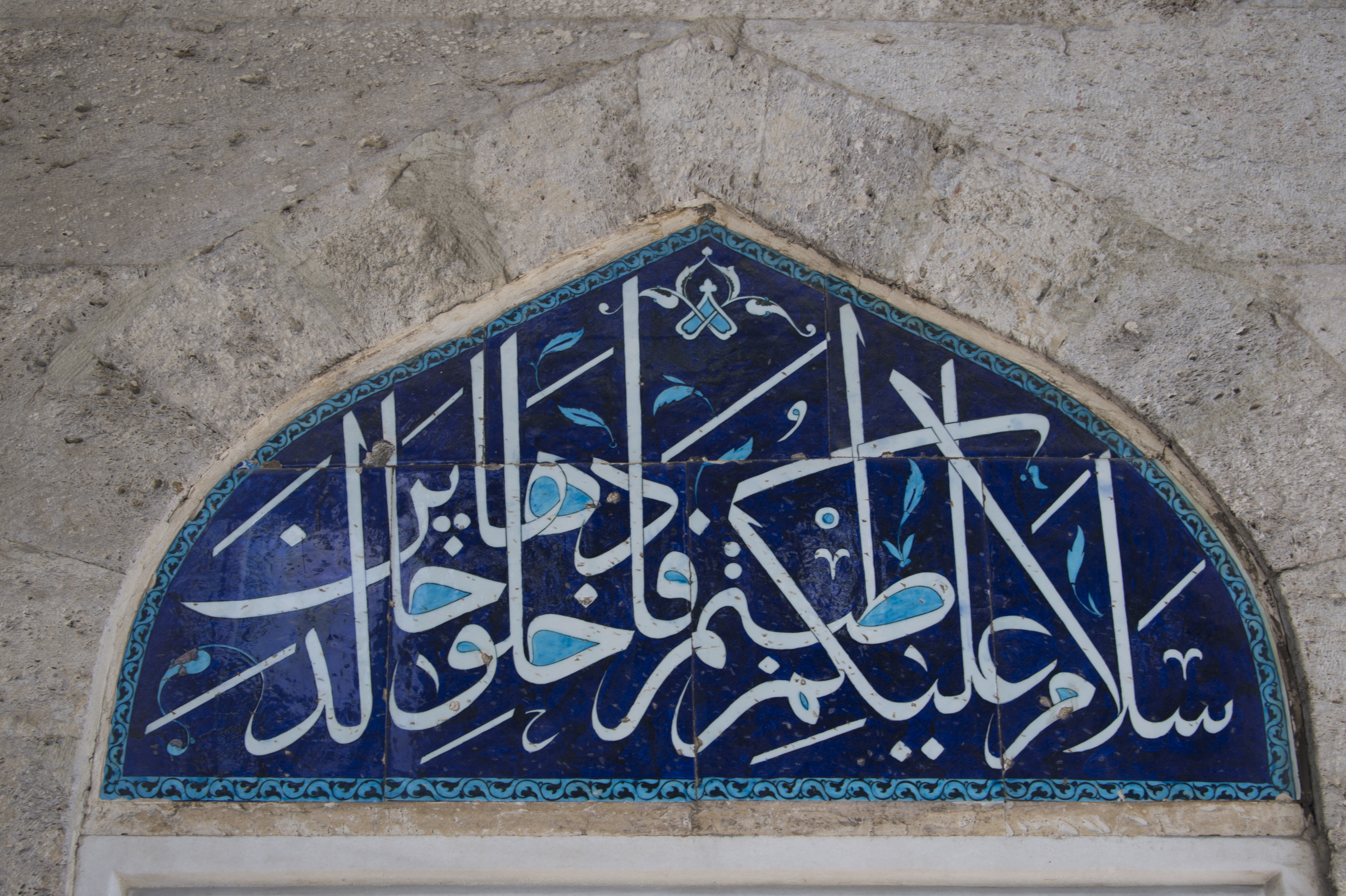
Hadim Ibrahim Mosque Islamic calligraphy above a window

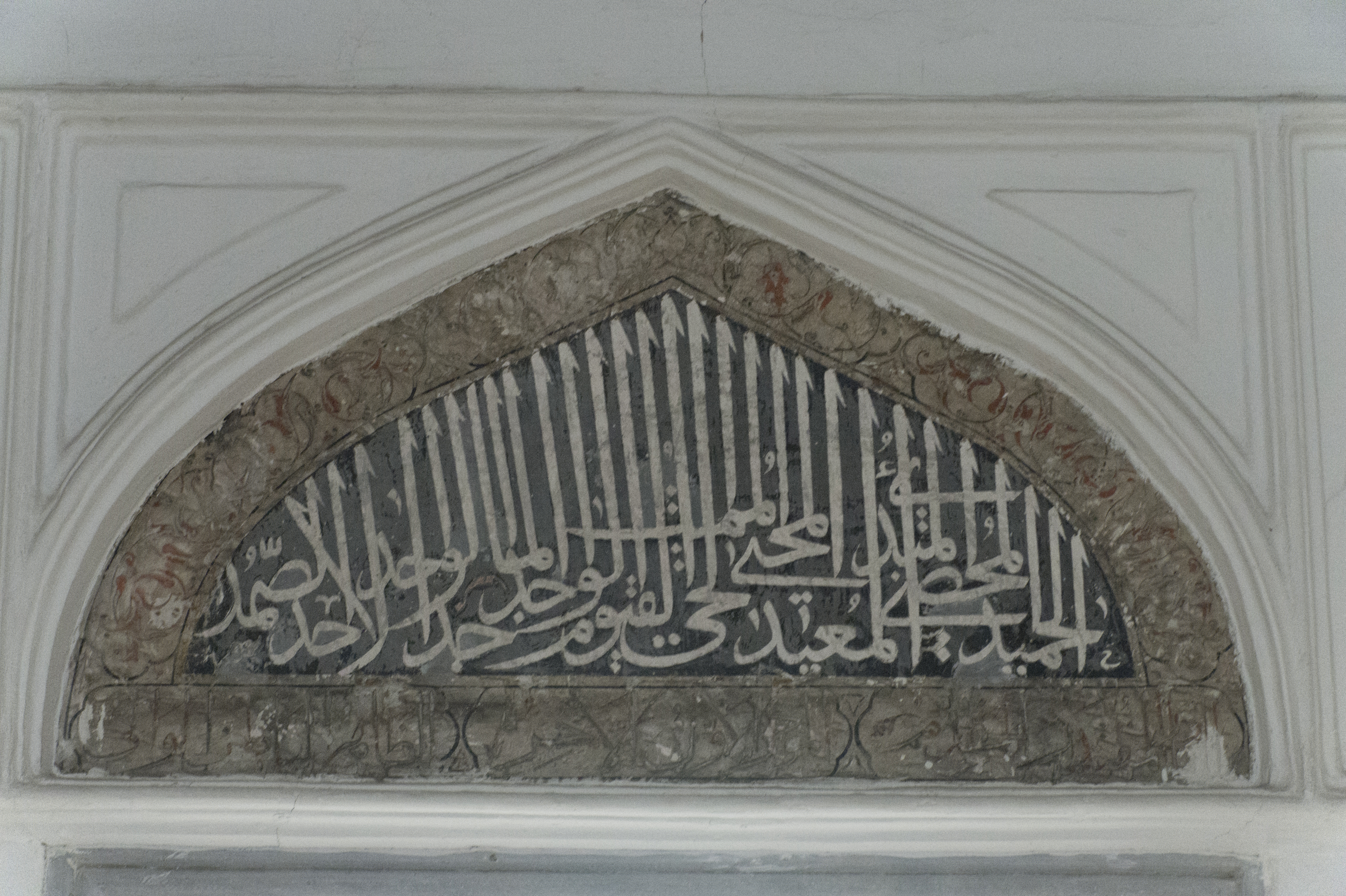
Hadim Ibrahim Mosque Islamic calligraphy above a window

== See also ==
- List of Friday mosques designed by Mimar Sinan

== Sources ==
- Atasoy, Nurhan; Raby, Julian (1989). Iznik: The Pottery of Ottoman Turkey. London: Alexandra Press. ISBN 978-1-85669-054-6.
- Carswell, John (2006) [1998]. Iznik Pottery. London: British Museum Press. ISBN 978-0-7141-2441-4.
- Necipoğlu, Gülru (2005). The Age of Sinan: Architectural Culture in the Ottoman Empire. London: Reaktion Books. ISBN 978-1-86189-253-9.
