= Church of St. Giacomo =

Church building in Vicovaro, Italy

The Church of St. Giacomo is a small 15th-century church in Vicovaro above Tivoli, Italy.

It was built by the Orsini family, the family coat of arms is carved above the door. An early Renaissance building, it is noted by architectural historians as an example of the transition from Gothic to Renaissance style. The octagonal church is regarded as an homage to the Dome of the Rock, widely regarded in Europe in the late Middle Ages as reflecting the architecture of the Temple at Jerusalem.
