= Dome of the Rock =

Islamic building in Al-Aqsa, Jerusalem

- Qubbat aṣ-Ṣakhra قبّة الصخرة
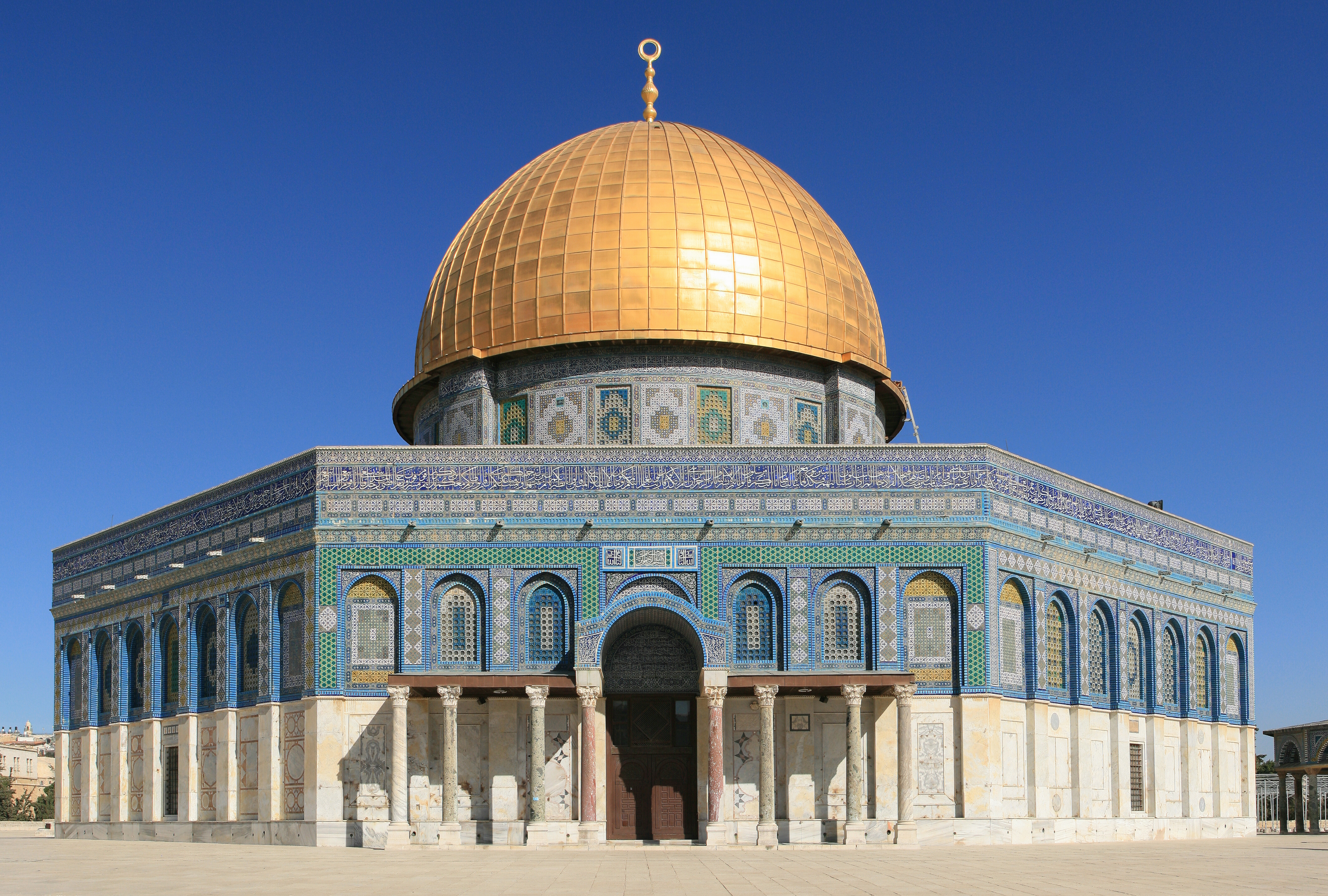

- Location within the Old City of Jerusalem

Religion
- Affiliation: Islam

Location
- Location: Jerusalem
- Administration: Ministry of Awqaf (Jordan)
- Coordinates: 31.7780°N 35.2354°E

Architecture
- Architects: Raja ibn Haywa al-Kindi; Yazid ibn Sallam
- Style: Umayyad (with later exterior Ottoman decoration)
- Founder: Abd al-Malik ibn Marwan
- Established: c. 685–692

The Dome of the Rock (Arabic: قبة الصخرة, romanized: Qubbat aṣ-Ṣaḫra) is an octagonal Islamic shrine at the center of the Al-Aqsa mosque compound on the Temple Mount in the Old City of Jerusalem. It is the world's oldest surviving work of Islamic architecture, the earliest archaeologically-attested religious structure to be built by a Muslim ruler and contains the earliest inscriptions proclaiming Islam and the prophet Muhammad.

Its initial construction was undertaken by the Umayyad Caliphate on the orders of Abd al-Malik during the Second Fitna in 691–692 CE, and it has been built on top of the Foundation Stone (or Noble Rock). The site's significance for Muslims derives from the belief that the Night Journey of Muhammad began from the rock at the centre of the structure. It is believed in Christianity and Judaism to be the site where Abraham attempted to sacrifice his son, and it is believed to be built on the site of the Second Jewish Temple (built in c. 516 BCE to replace the destroyed Solomon's Temple and expanded by Herod the Great), which was destroyed by the Romans in 70 CE. The temple bears great significance in Judaism as the place where God created the world as well as the first human, Adam, and as the place where God's divine presence is manifested more than in any other place, towards which Jews turn during prayer.

Its plan and original mosaic decoration were patterned after nearby Byzantine churches and palaces. The octagonal plan may have been influenced by the Byzantine-era Church of the Seat of Mary (also known as Kathisma in Greek and al-Qadismu in Arabic), which was built between 451 and 458 on the road between Jerusalem and Bethlehem. The large dome has a subtly bulbous form. The original dome collapsed in 1015 and was rebuilt in 1022–23. The monument's outside appearance was significantly changed during the early Ottoman period, when brightly coloured, mainly blue-and-white Iznik-style tiles were applied to the exterior, and again in the modern period, notably with the addition of the gold-plated roof, in 1959–64 and again in the 1990s.

Designated by UNESCO as a World Heritage Site, it has been called "Jerusalem's most recognizable landmark" Its golden dome dominates Jerusalem’s skyline, and remains visible from all approaches to the city. Its Islamic inscriptions proved to be a milestone, as afterward they became a common feature in Islamic structures and almost always mention Muhammad. The Dome of the Rock remains a "unique monument of Islamic culture in almost all respects", including as a "work of art and as a cultural and pious document", according to art historian Oleg Grabar.

== Architecture ==
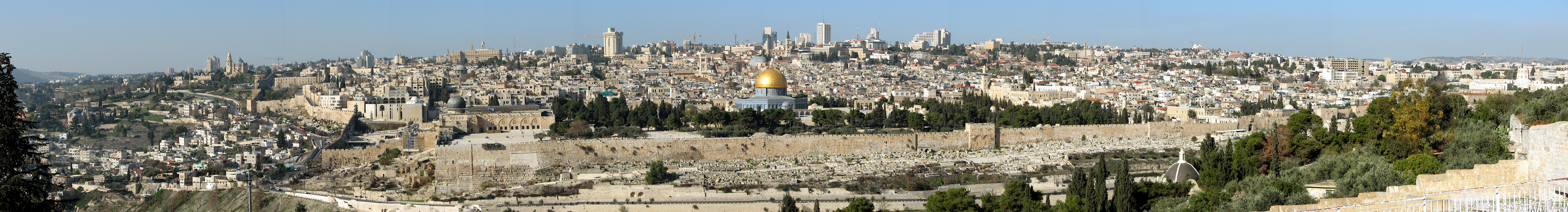
Panorama of the Al-Aqsa Mosque Compound, including its Qibli Mosque and the gold-roofed Dome of the Rock, from the Mount of Olives

=== Structure ===
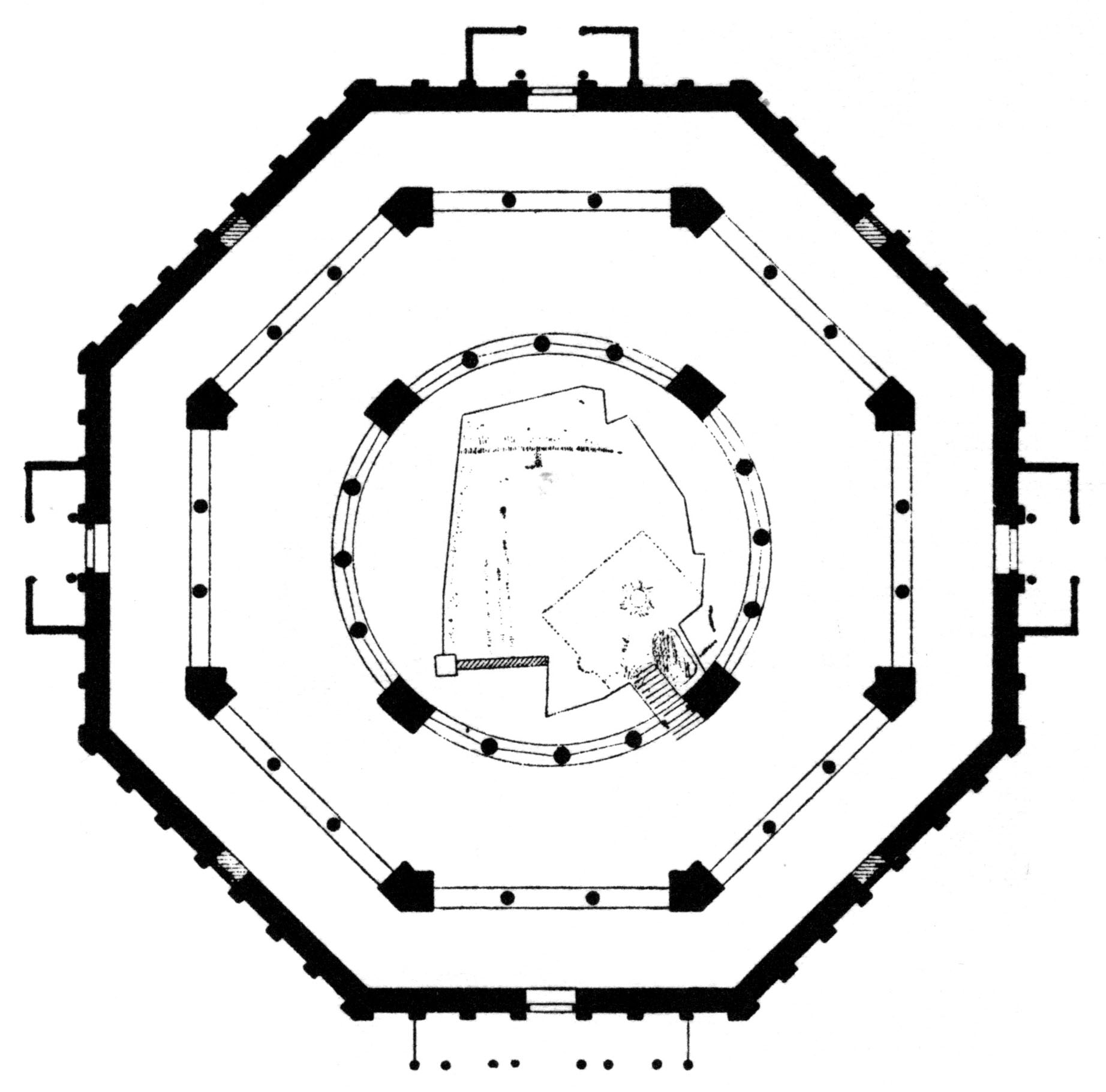
Floor plan of the Dome of the Rock

The Dome of the Rock's basic plan is essentially octagonal. It is capped at its center by a dome, approximately 20 m (66 ft) in diameter, mounted on an elevated circular drum standing on 16 supports (4 piers and 12 columns). Surrounding this circle is an octagonal arcade of 24 piers and columns. The inner circular row of drum supports and the octagonal arcade create an inner ambulatory that encircles the holy rock. The outer walls are also octagonal. They each measure approximately 60 m (200 ft) wide and 36 m (118 ft) high. The inner and outer octagon create a second, outer ambulatorium surrounding the inner one. Both the circular drum and the exterior walls contain many windows. There are four entrances to the building, one for each cardinal direction, and the outer wall is pierced by 36 windows.

Interior areas

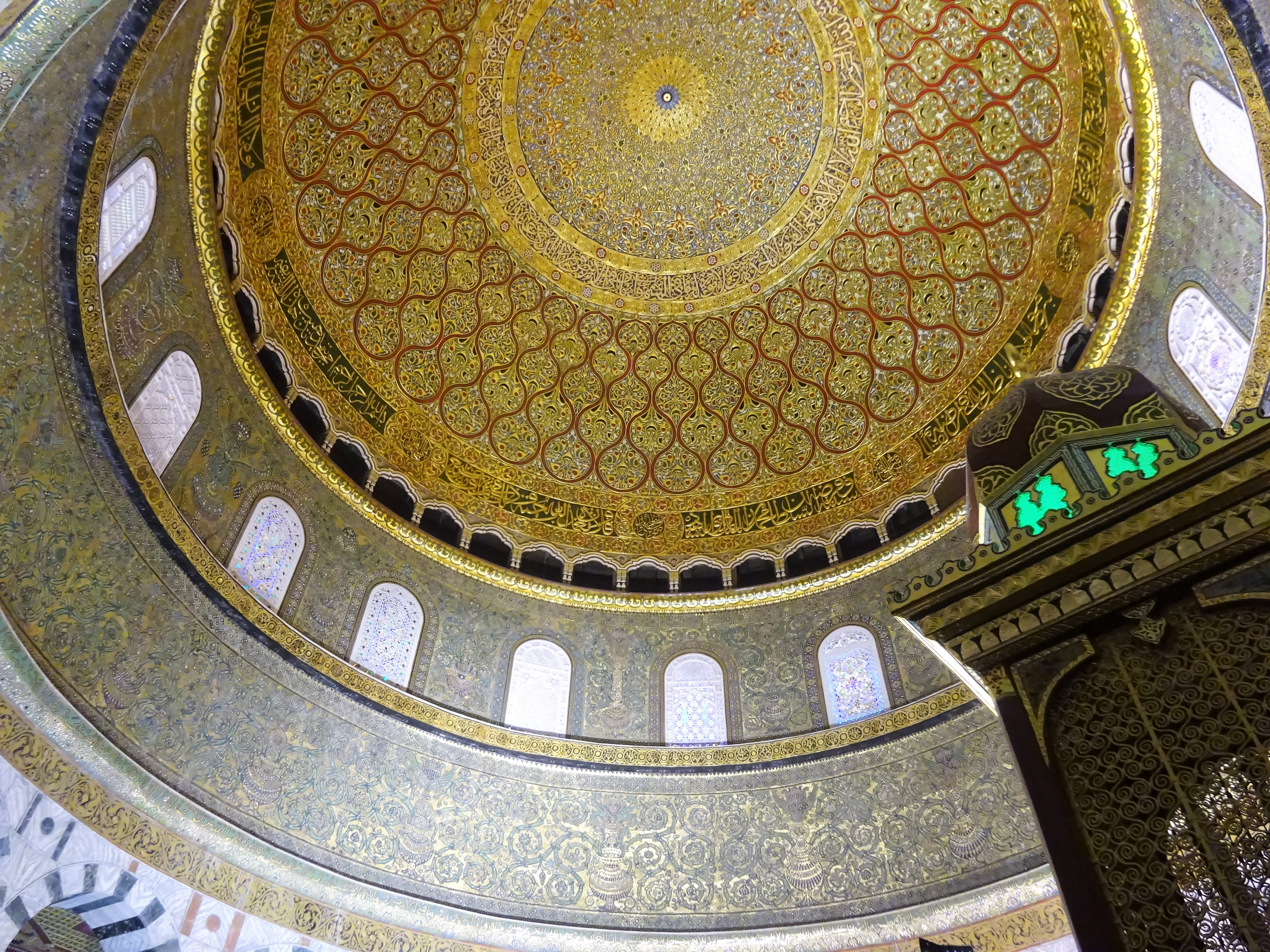
Interior of the dome

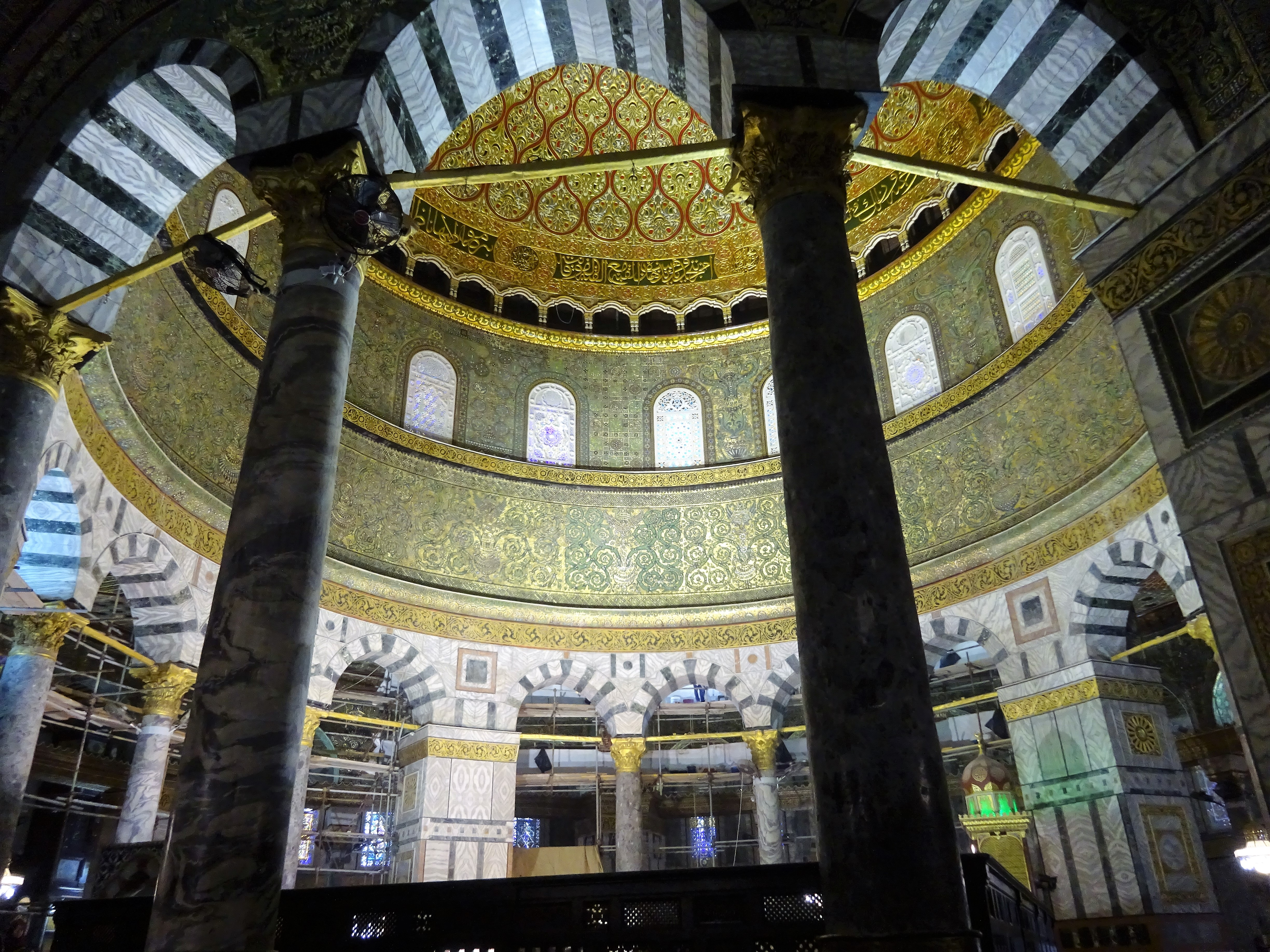
View of the circular inner ablaq arcade around the dome

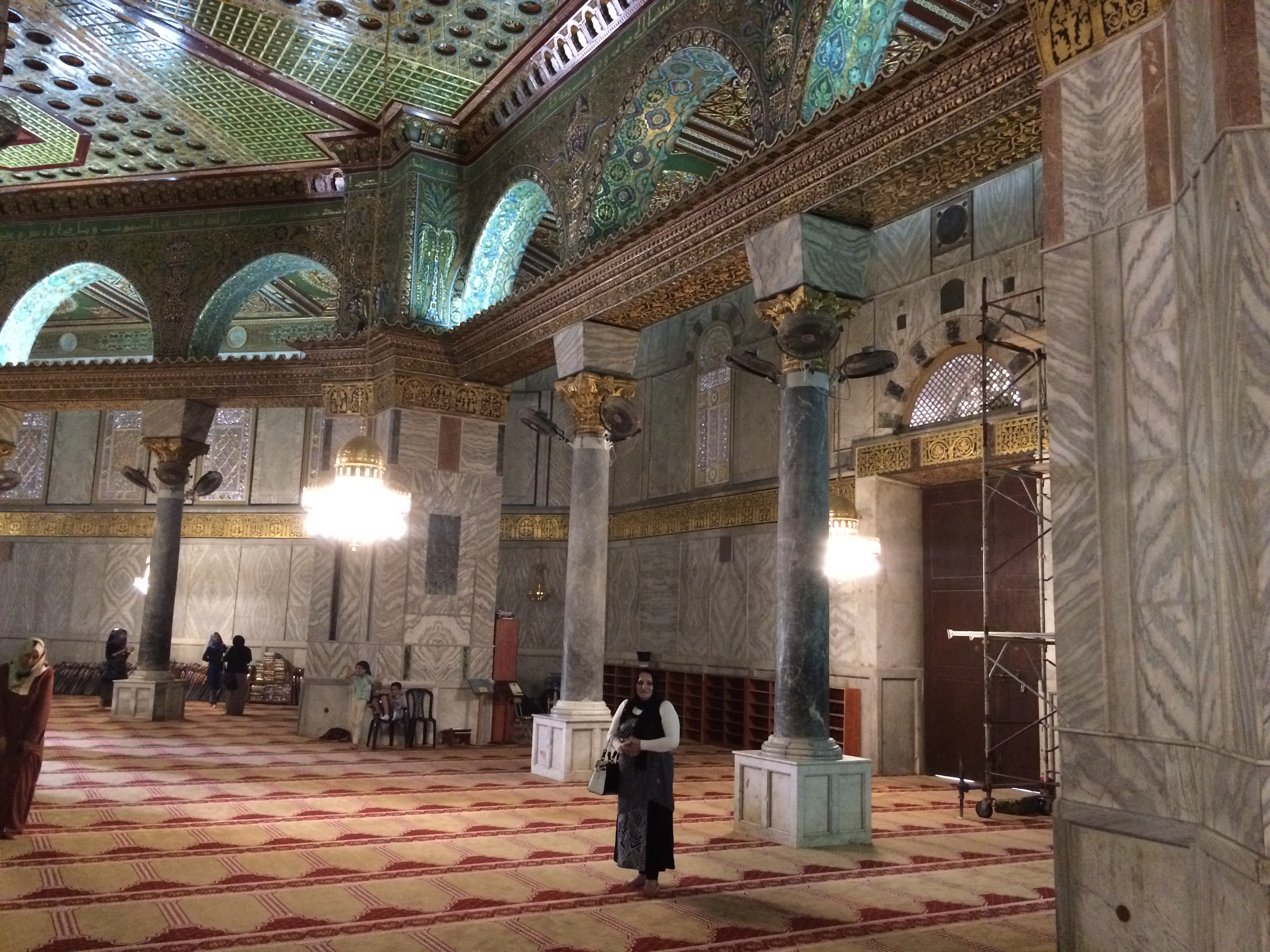
The inner ambulatory, with the octagonal arcade and the outer wall visible that contain Umayyad-era inscriptions and mosaics.

=== Interior decoration ===
The interior of the dome is lavishly decorated with mosaic, faience and marble, much of which was added several centuries after its completion. The inner colonnade features ablaq light and dark stone voussoirs in its arches. The origins of these marble treatments are controversial, with some scholars theorizing them to be from the original construction, and some saying they were later additions (and differing then as to the dates and identity of the builders). The columns and capitals of both the inner and outer arcades were reused from older ancient buildings.

Many surfaces are covered by mosaic decoration, in particular: both sides of the octagonal arcade (on and around the arches in the upper area above the columns), the outer side of the circular arcade (again along the upper parts), the lower drum of the dome (the zone below the windows), and the upper drum of the dome (the zone containing the windows). In total, the mosaics cover approximately 1,200 square metres (13,000 sq ft) of surface. The decorative motifs, inspired by late antique Byzantine and Sasanian art, mainly depict stylized plants and trees (sometimes growing from vases), geometric patterns, and jewellery. The mosaics have undergone multiple restorations, additions, and modifications over the centuries but much of it still dates from the Umayyad period or retains the original Umayyad designs, which includes the mosaics around the inner circular and outer octagonal arcades. The main exception is the mosaics of the upper drum, which have been significantly altered by later restorations, as well as several inscriptions added during later periods.

Some other elements of original Umayyad decoration include a carved, painted, and gilded marble band that runs along the outer wall (at around mid-height), as well as some of the gilded metal plaques (of either brass or bronze) that adorn the tie-beams along the octagonal arcade. The flat ceilings of the ambulatories today are made of wood and feature painted decoration dating to various periods, though the actual wooden structure of the ceilings may date from the 14th century. Some scholars believe that during the Umayyad and Abbasid periods the ambulatories did not have such a ceiling at all, meaning that the beams supporting the outer roof above were left exposed and may have supported lamps that better illuminated some of the mosaic decoration on the upper surfaces of the arcades. The present-day painted and gilded decoration of the outer ambulatory ceiling dates from the Mamluk period, likely during al-Nasir Muhammad's restoration circa 1327–28, while the painted decoration of the inner ambulatory ceiling mainly reflects 18th-century and 19th-century Ottoman styles. The Mamluk decoration was restored faithfully in 1960–21 and the Ottoman decoration underwent restoration in 1963, with some minor changes. An Ottoman inscription from 1780 and an eyewitness account from the 1860s both record that the small domelets or mini-domes in this ceiling were at one time filled with Chinese porcelain bowls that were inserted during the 1780 restoration. The current painted and gilded decoration inside the central dome itself is based on traditional Ottoman ornamentation.

==== Octagonal arcade inscriptions ====
The interior decoration also contains Qur'anic inscriptions. They vary from today's standard text (mainly changes from the first to the third person) and are mixed with pious (Shahada) inscriptions. The Umayyad-era inscriptions on the upper outer and inner octagonal arcades were written using early Kufic script with very minimal diacritical marks which was the case with early Quranic scripts and Arabic writing. The dedicatory inscription in Kufic script placed around the octagonal arcade contains the date believed to be the year the monument was first completed, 72 AH (691/2 CE), while the name of the corresponding caliph and builder of the Dome, Abd al-Malik ibn Marwan, was later erased and replaced by the name of the Abbasid caliph al-Ma'mun (r. 813–833).

==== Dome and drum inscriptions ====
A rectangular inscription panel added into the mosaics inside the drum of the dome records the restoration by the Fatimid caliph al-Zahir with the date 413 AH (1027/8 CE), though this may be only a fragment of the original Fatimid inscriptions. An inscription band in a cursive Arabic script from the Ayyubid period can be found along the lower edge of the dome's drum and contains Qur'anic verses. Further above, inside the dome, are two separate inscription bands from the Ottoman period. The upper/inner band, around the apex of the dome, contains the Throne Verse from the Qur'an and dates to 1874–75. The lower/outer band records various restorations by different Ottoman, Mamluk, and Ayyubid rulers, preserving information from older inscriptions that had been repeatedly shortened or lost during earlier restorations. The names and dates recorded in this band include: the Ayybud sultan Saladin in 586 AH (1191), the Mamluk sultan al-Nasir Muhammad in 717 AH (1317), and the Ottoman sultans Mahmud I in 1156 AH (1754) and Abdulaziz in 1291 AH (1874).

Interior decoration

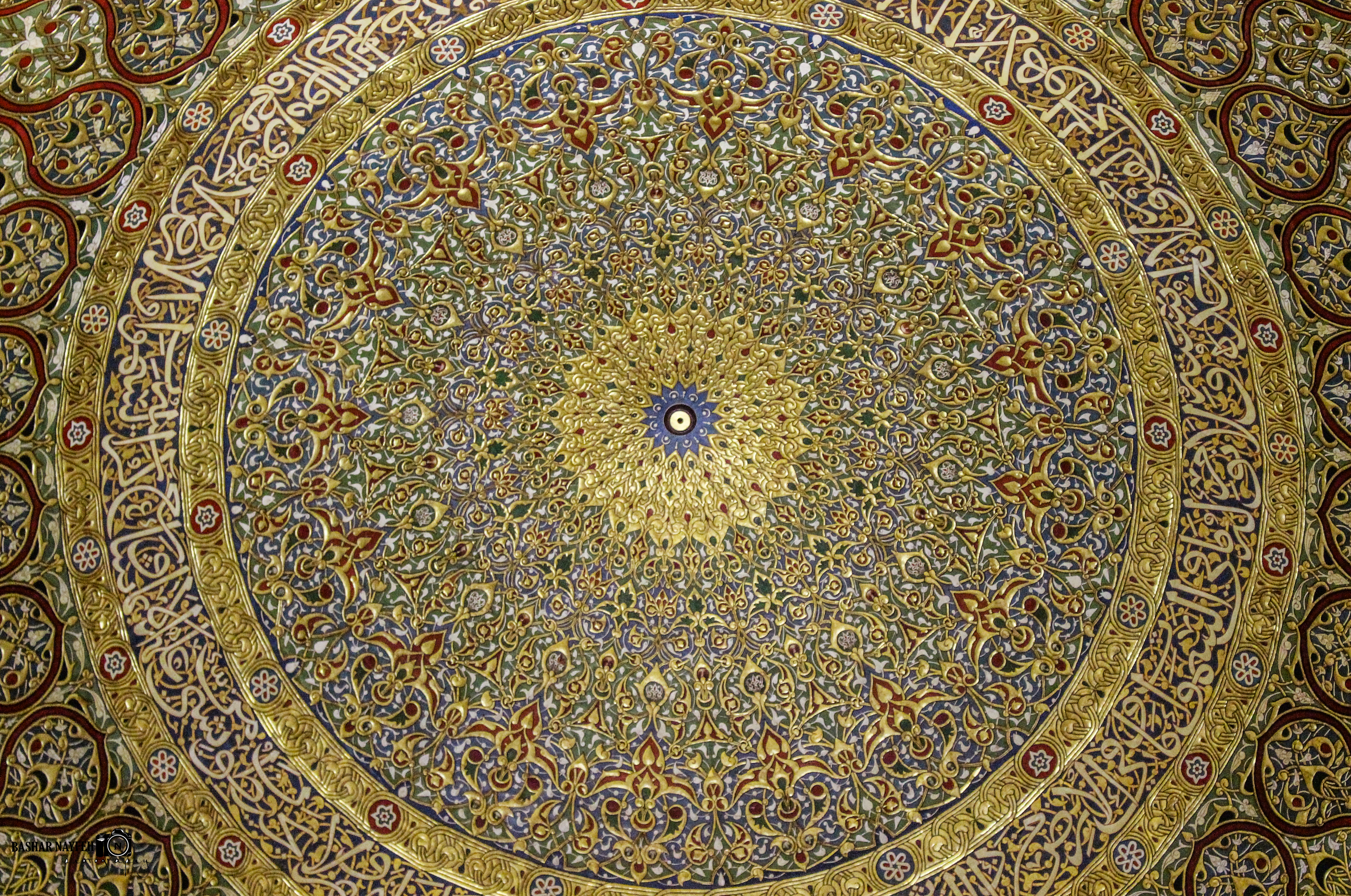
Painted and gilded decoration at the center of the dome, including a circular 19th-century Ottoman inscription of the Qur'an's Throne Verse

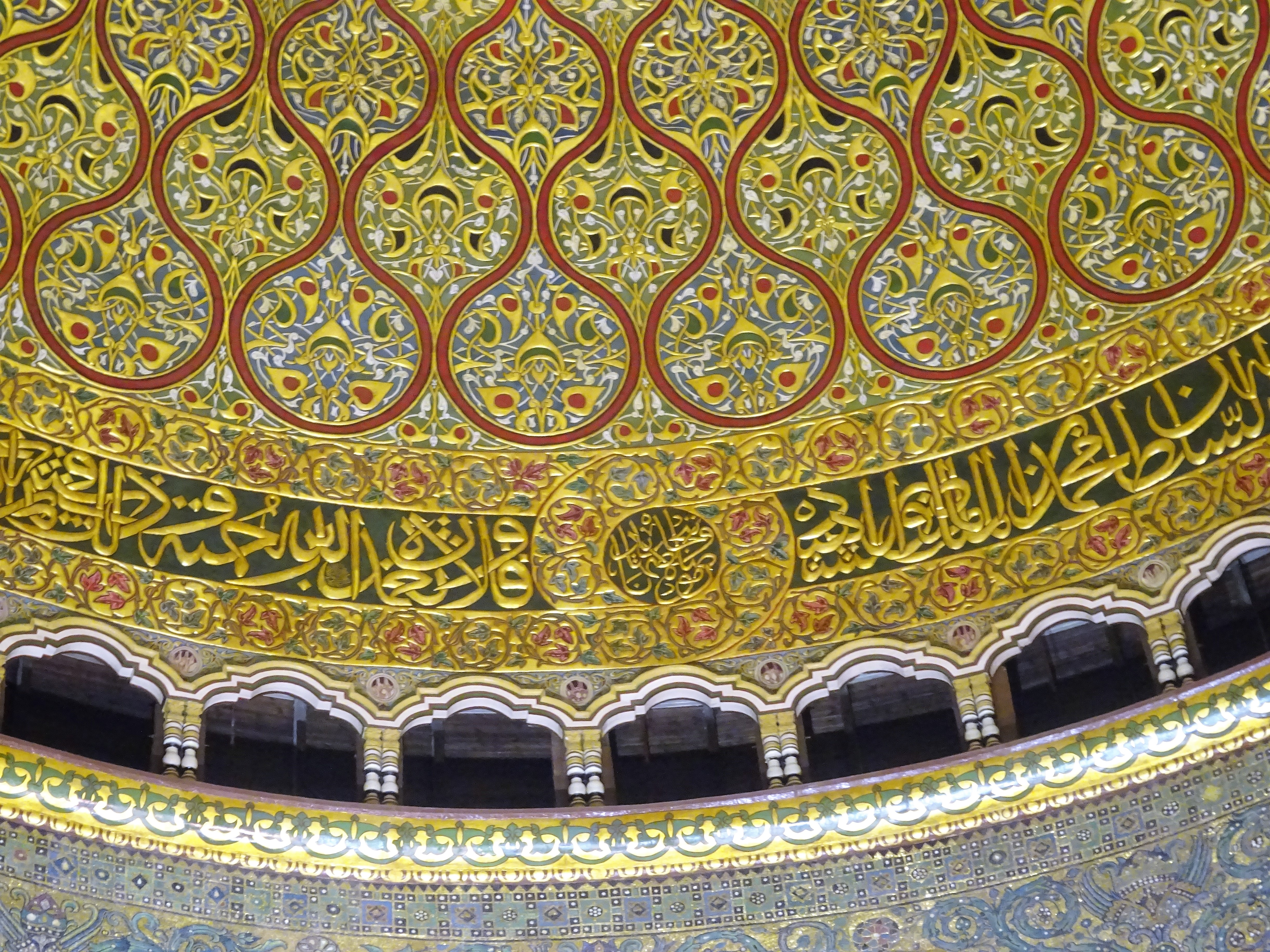
The second inscription band inside the dome, also from the late Ottoman period, records successive restorations by various rulers from the 12th to 19th centuries.

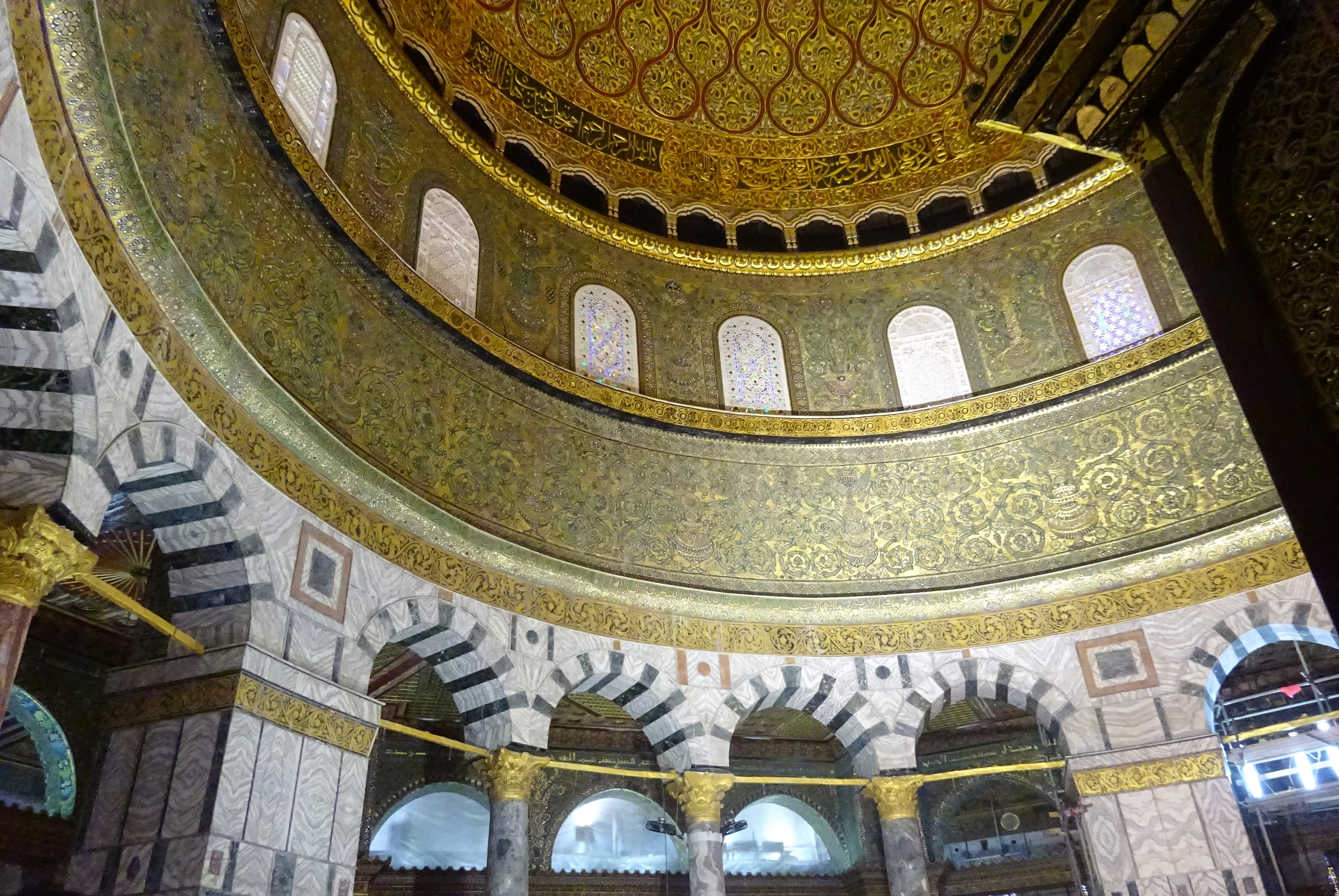
View of the dome's drum: the lower drum (below the windows) and the upper drum (at window level) are covered in mosaics

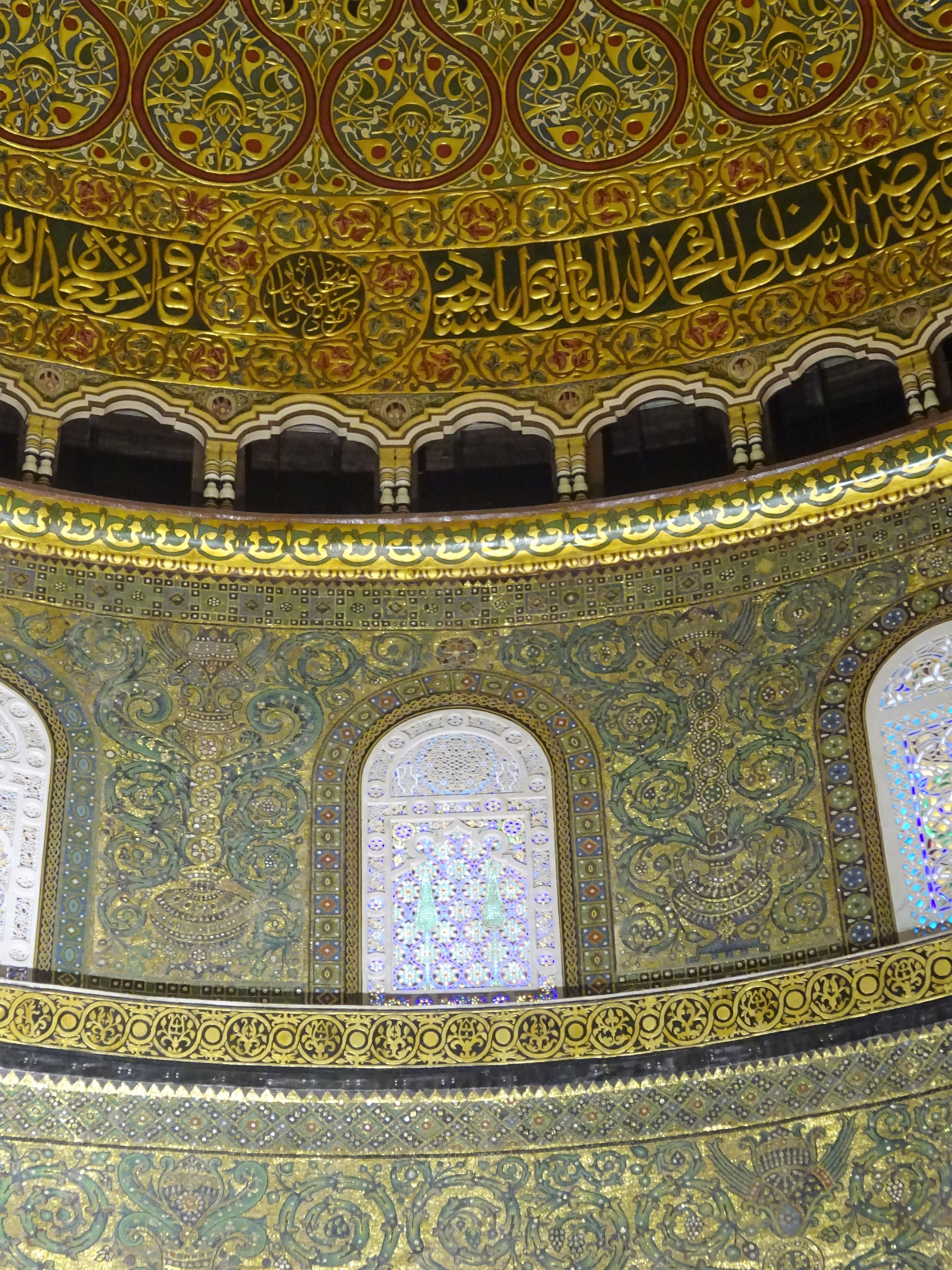
Closer view of the mosaics in the drum of the dome

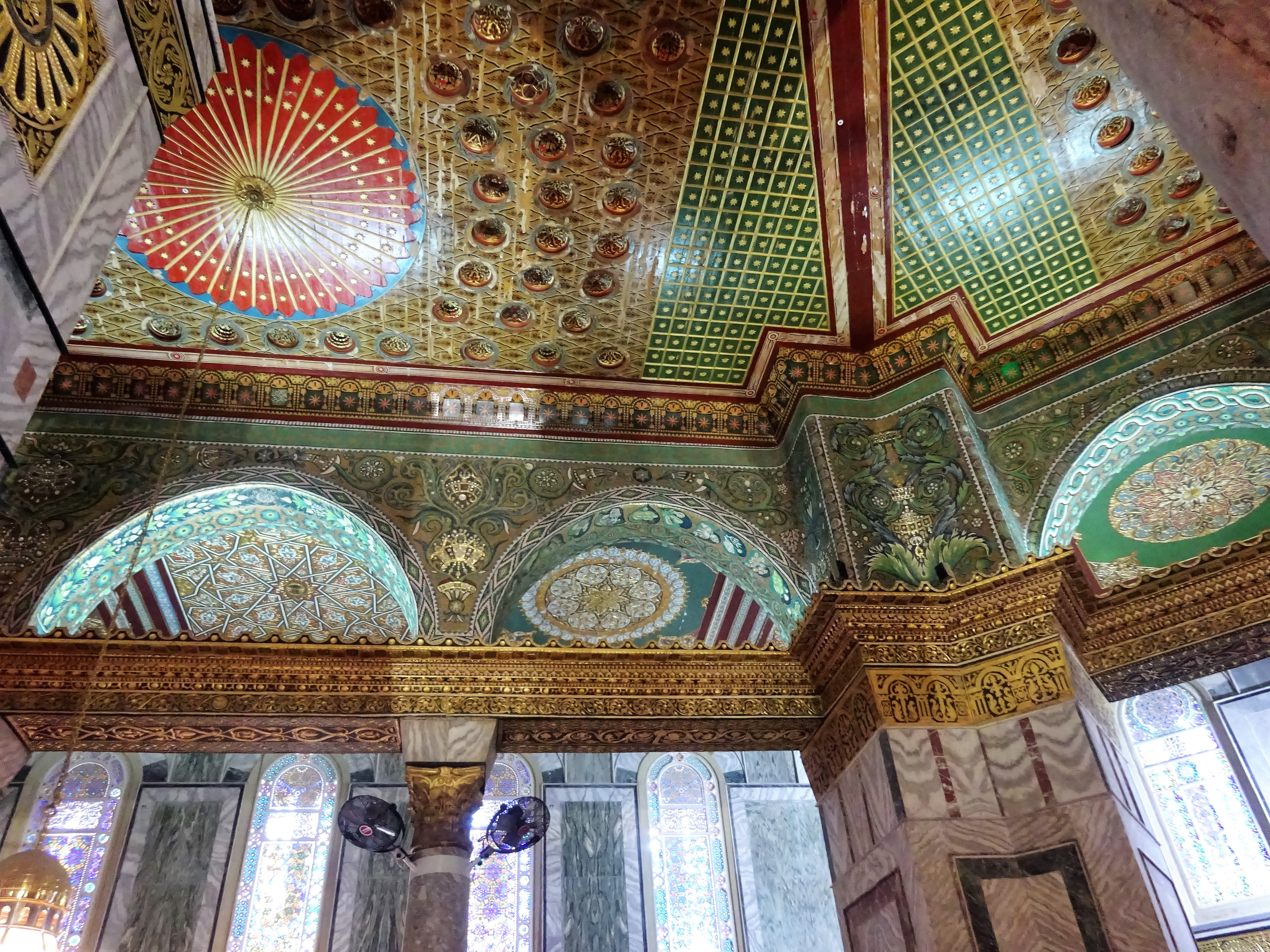
View of decoration on the octagonal outer arcade: mosaics (on and between the arches) and the tie-beams covered with gilded metal plaques (under the arches)

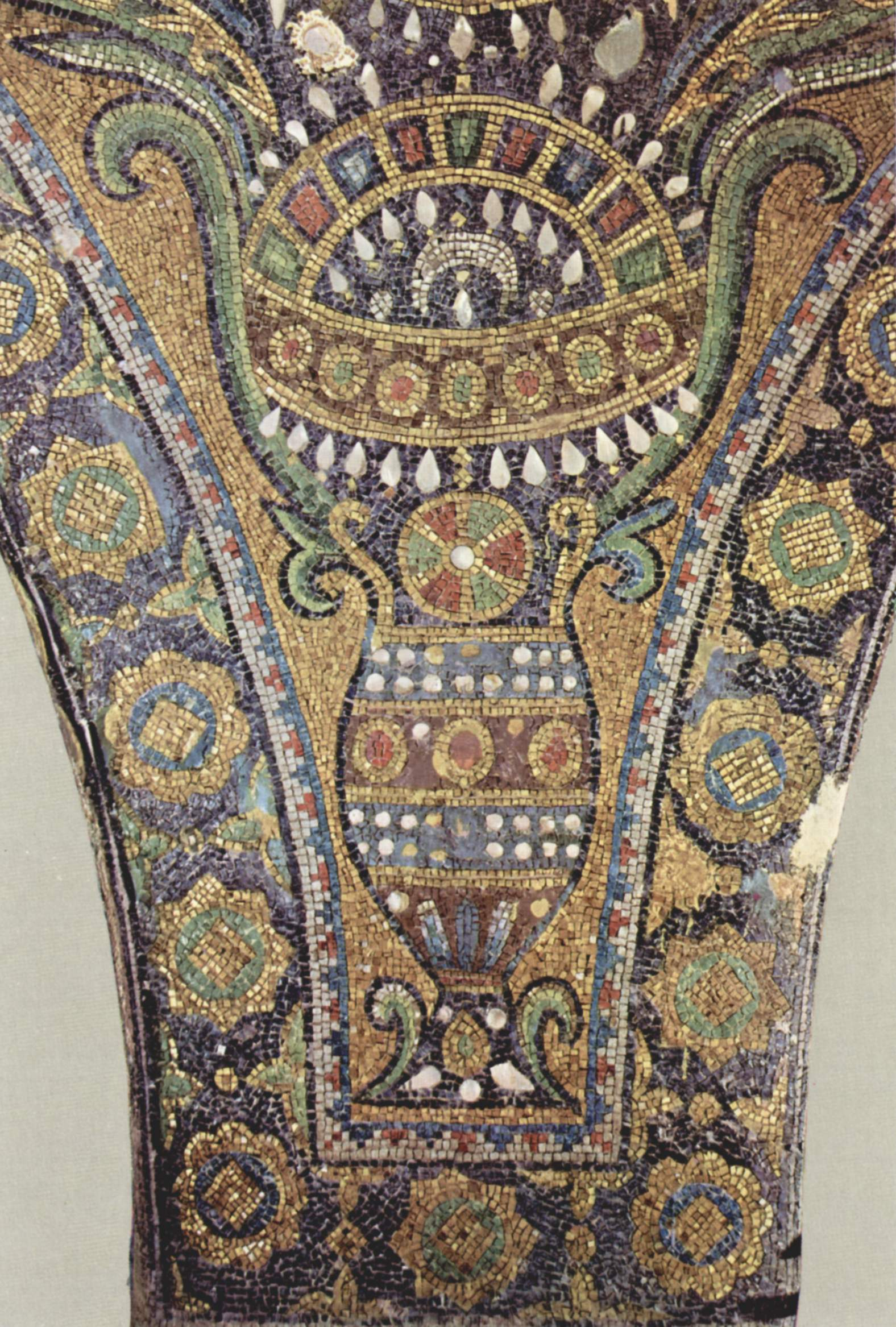
Detail of mosaic on the inner side of the octagonal arcade

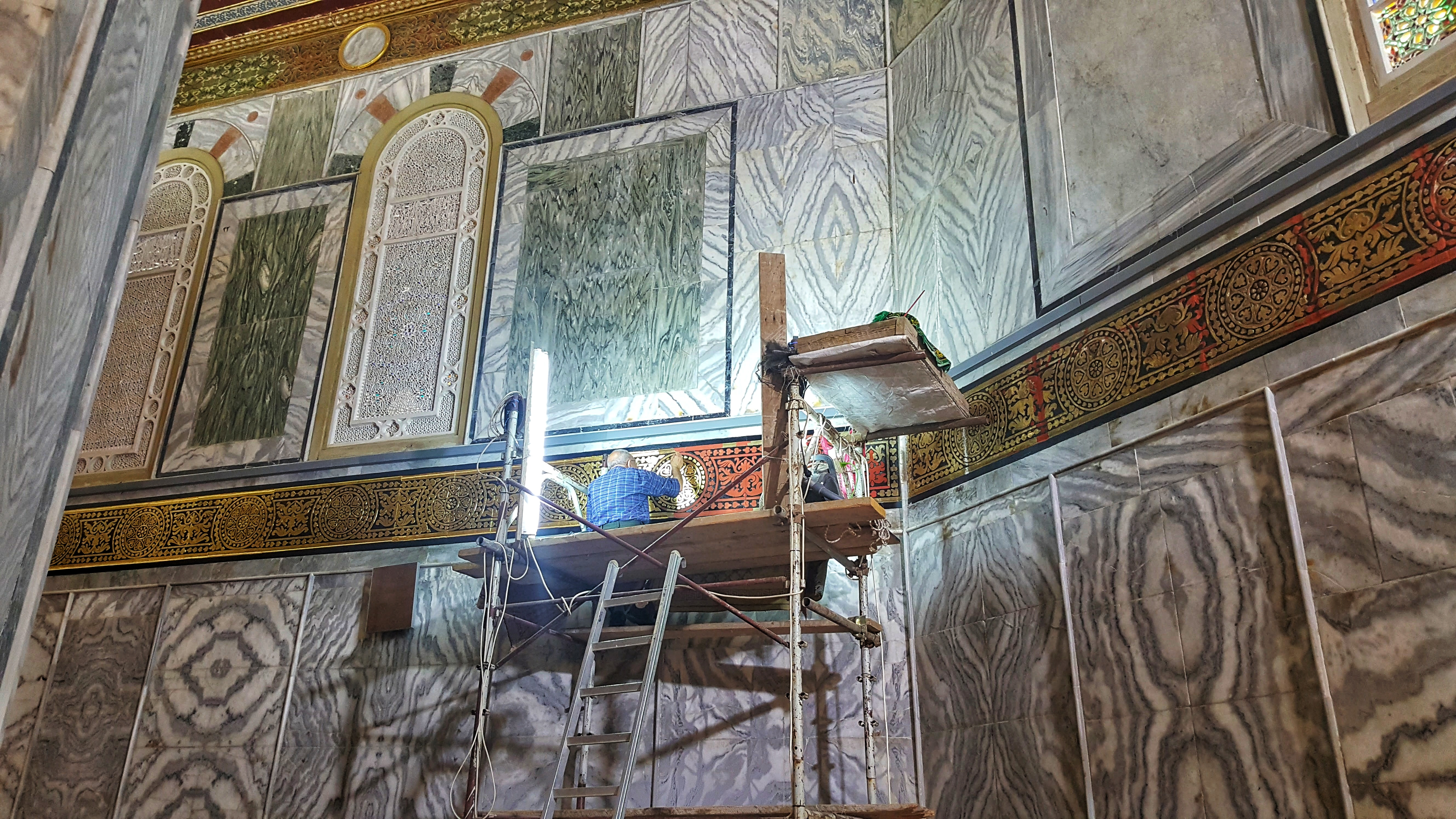
View of the carved, painted, and gilded marble frieze running at mid-height along the outer wall

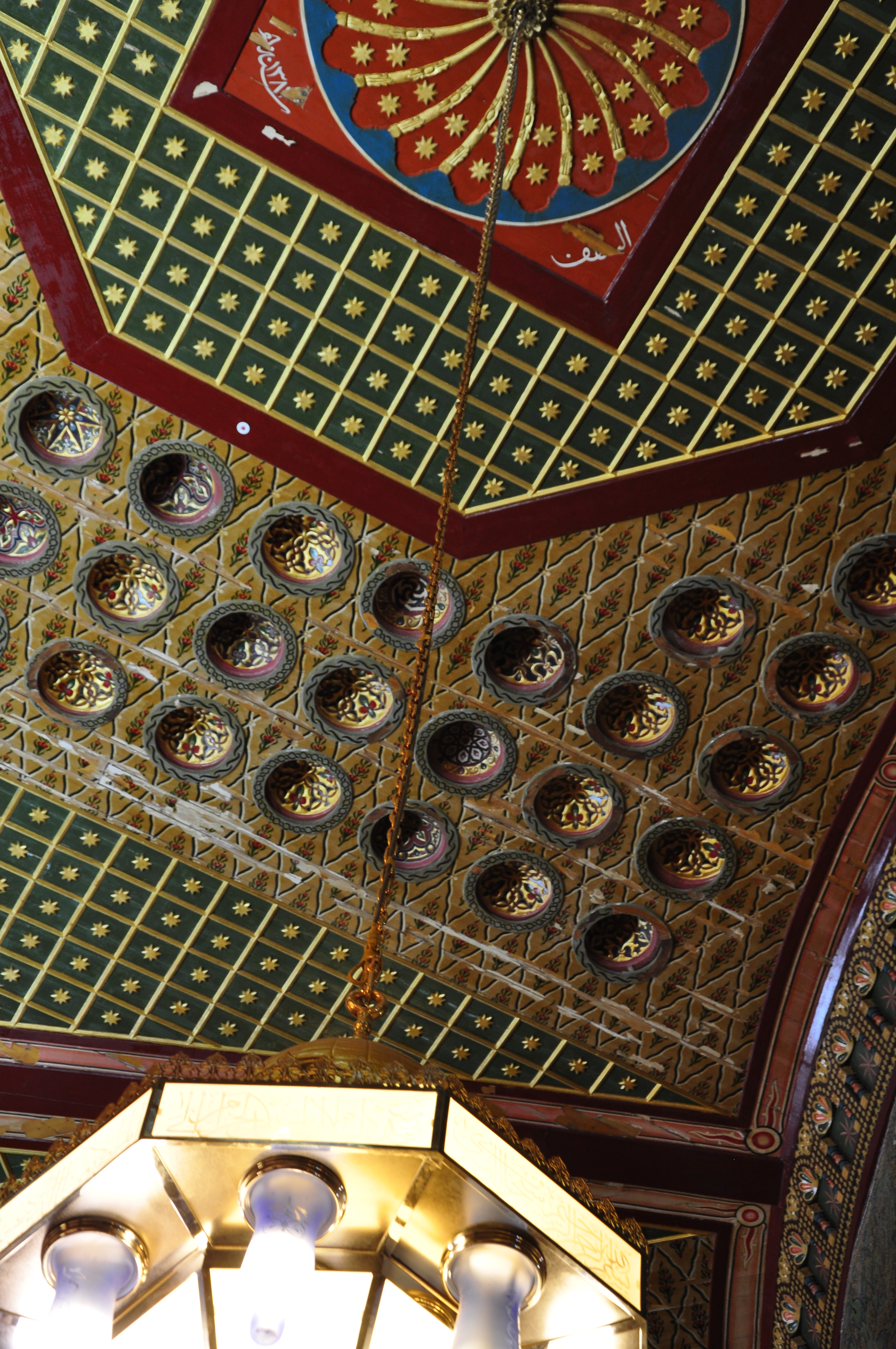
Wooden ceilings of the inner ambulatory, with painted decoration dating from the Ottoman period

=== Exterior decoration ===
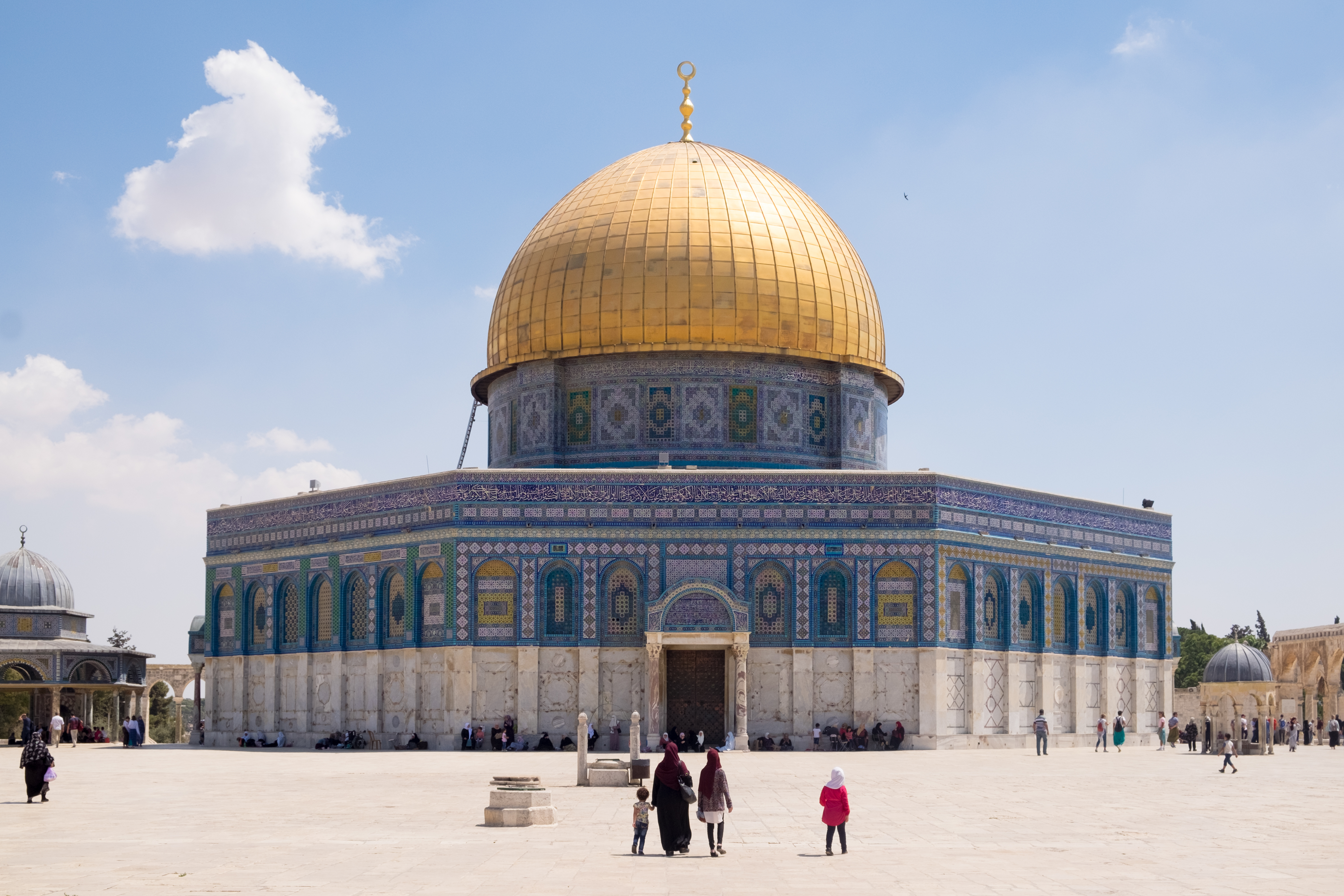
The Dome of the Rock as seen from the north, and on its left the Dome of the Chain

The earliest written descriptions of the dome mention its golden appearance. According to Oleg Grabar, "the Umayyad structure probably displayed this gilded effect from the beginning, although how this was achieved is unknown." According to traditional accounts compiled at a later period, a hundred thousand gold dinars from the funds granted by Abd al-Malik for the monument's construction remained unspent upon its completion, which the caliph then offered to the architects as a further reward. When they declined this payment, he instead ordered the dinars to be transformed into golden plates and used to adorn the dome. The golden appearance was later lost but was restored in 1961 using copper. In 1995, the golden dome was covered again with real gold-plated segments of aluminum and copper.

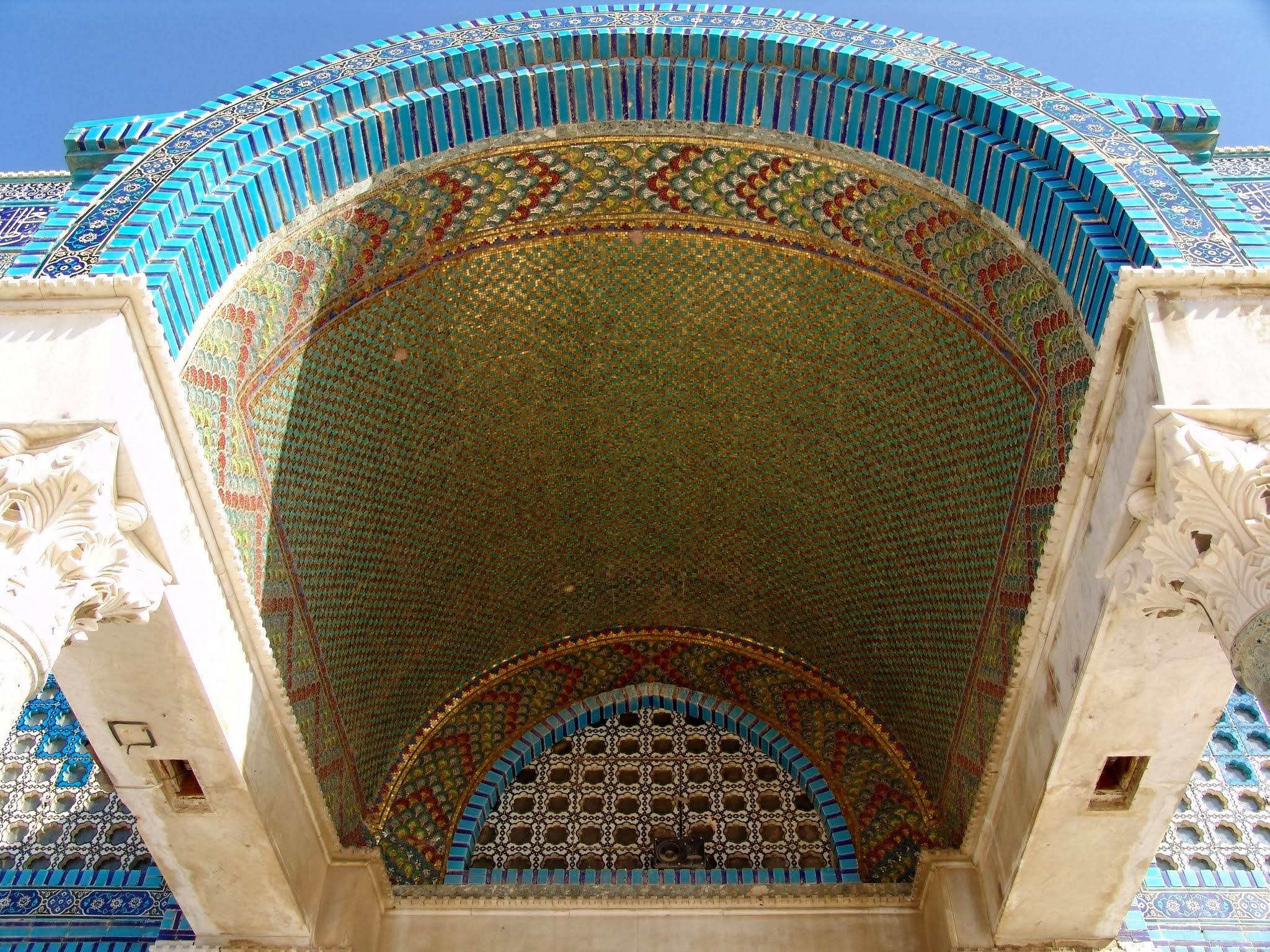
One of the vaulted porticos preceding the four entrances, dating from a 20th-century reconstruction

The decoration of the outer walls went through two major phases: the initial Umayyad scheme comprised a revetment of marble panels along the lower walls while the upper walls were covered with mosaics, much like the interior walls. Nothing of these exterior mosaics has survived except for some small fragments discovered during restorations and now housed in the Islamic Museum of al-Aqsa. The second major phase came in the 16th-century, when Ottoman sultan Suleiman the Magnificent renovated the building and replaced what remained of the exterior mosaics with Ottoman tile decoration. The tiles seem to have been fabricated locally rather than at centers like Iznik, while a small number of tiles were actual Iznik productions that were imported to Jerusalem. This tilework was of many different styles and techniques, including cuerda seca tiles, multi-coloured underglaze tiles, and blue-and-white tilework, resembling the Iznik tiles that were produced for the Ottoman capital. The new tile revetment also included Qashani tiles. The original tiles were replaced between 1960 and 1962 with copies produced in Italy. According to Oleg Grabar, it is unclear to what extent these tiles faithfully reproduced the original Ottoman-era tilework.

Surah Ya-Sin (the 'Heart of the Quran') is inscribed across the top of the tile work and was commissioned in the 16th century by Suleiman the Magnificent. Surah 17, Al-Isra', which tells the story of the Isra or Night Journey, is inscribed above this.

== History ==
=== Pre-Islamic background ===
The Dome of the Rock is situated in the center of the Temple Mount, the site of Solomon's Temple and the Second Jewish Temple, which had been greatly expanded under Herod the Great in the 1st century BCE. Herod's Temple was destroyed in 70 CE by the Romans, and after the Bar Kokhba revolt in 135 CE, a Roman temple to Jupiter Capitolinus was built at the site by Emperor Hadrian.

Jerusalem was ruled by the Byzantine Empire throughout the 4th to 6th centuries. During this time, Christian pilgrimage to Jerusalem began to develop. The Church of the Holy Sepulchre was built under Constantine in the 320s, but the Temple Mount was left undeveloped after a failed project of restoration of the Jewish Temple under Emperor Julian.

In 638 CE, Byzantine Jerusalem was conquered by the Arab armies of Umar ibn al-Khattab, second Caliph of the Rashidun Caliphate. Umar was advised by Ka'b al-Ahbar, a Jewish rabbi who converted to Islam, that the site is identical with the site of the former Jewish Temples in Jerusalem. Among the first Muslims, Jerusalem was referred to as Madinat bayt al-Maqdis ('City of the Temple').

=== Umayyads ===
==== Original construction ====
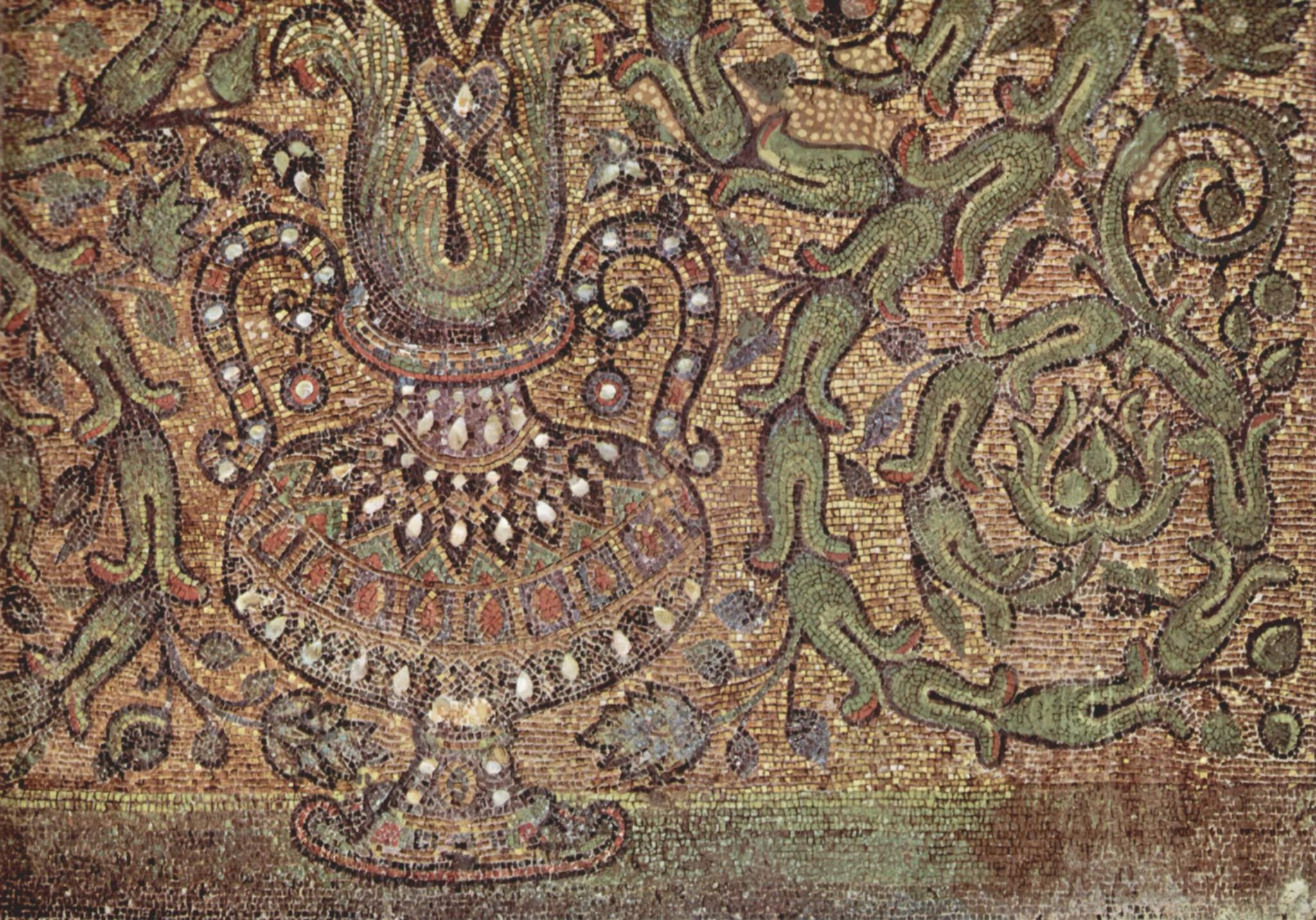
Detail of mosaic decoration inside the Dome of the Rock. Much of the mosaic decoration visible today still preserves the original Umayyad designs.

The initial octagonal structure of the Dome of the Rock and its round wooden dome had basically the same shape as it does today. It was built by the order of the Umayyad caliph Abd al-Malik (r. 685–705). According to Sibt ibn al-Jawzi (1185–1256), construction started in 685/6, while al-Suyuti (1445–1505) holds that its commencement year was 688. A dedicatory inscription in Kufic script is preserved inside the dome. The date is recorded as AH 72 (691/2 CE), the year most historians believe the construction of the original Dome was completed. An alternative interpretation of the inscription claims that it indicates the year when construction started. In this inscription, the name of "al-Malik" was removed and replaced by the name of the Abbasid caliph al-Ma'mun (r. 813–833). This alteration of the original inscription was first noted by Melchior de Vogüé in 1864. Some scholars have suggested that the dome was added to an existing building, built either by Muawiyah I (r. 661–680), or indeed a Byzantine building dating to before the Muslim conquest, built under Heraclius (r. 610–641).

The supervisor and engineer in charge of the project were Raja ibn Haywa, Yazid ibn Sallam, and the latter's son Baha. Raja was a Muslim theologian and native of Beisan, and Yazid and Baha were mawali (non-Arab, Muslim converts; clients) of Abd al-Malik from Jerusalem. Abd al-Malik was represented in the supervision of the construction by his son Sa'id al-Khayr. The Caliph employed expert workers from across his domain, at the time restricted to Syria and Egypt, who were presumably Christians. Construction cost was reportedly seven times the yearly tax income of Egypt.

The Dome of the Rock's architecture and mosaics were patterned after nearby Byzantine churches and palaces. The historian K. A. C. Creswell noted that those who built the shrine used the measurements of the Church of the Holy Sepulchre. The diameter of the dome of the shrine is 20.20 m (66.3 ft) and its height 20.48 m (67.2 ft), while the diameter of the dome of the Church of the Holy Sepulchre is 20.90 m (68.6 ft) and its height 21.05 m (69.1 ft).

==== Motivations for construction ====
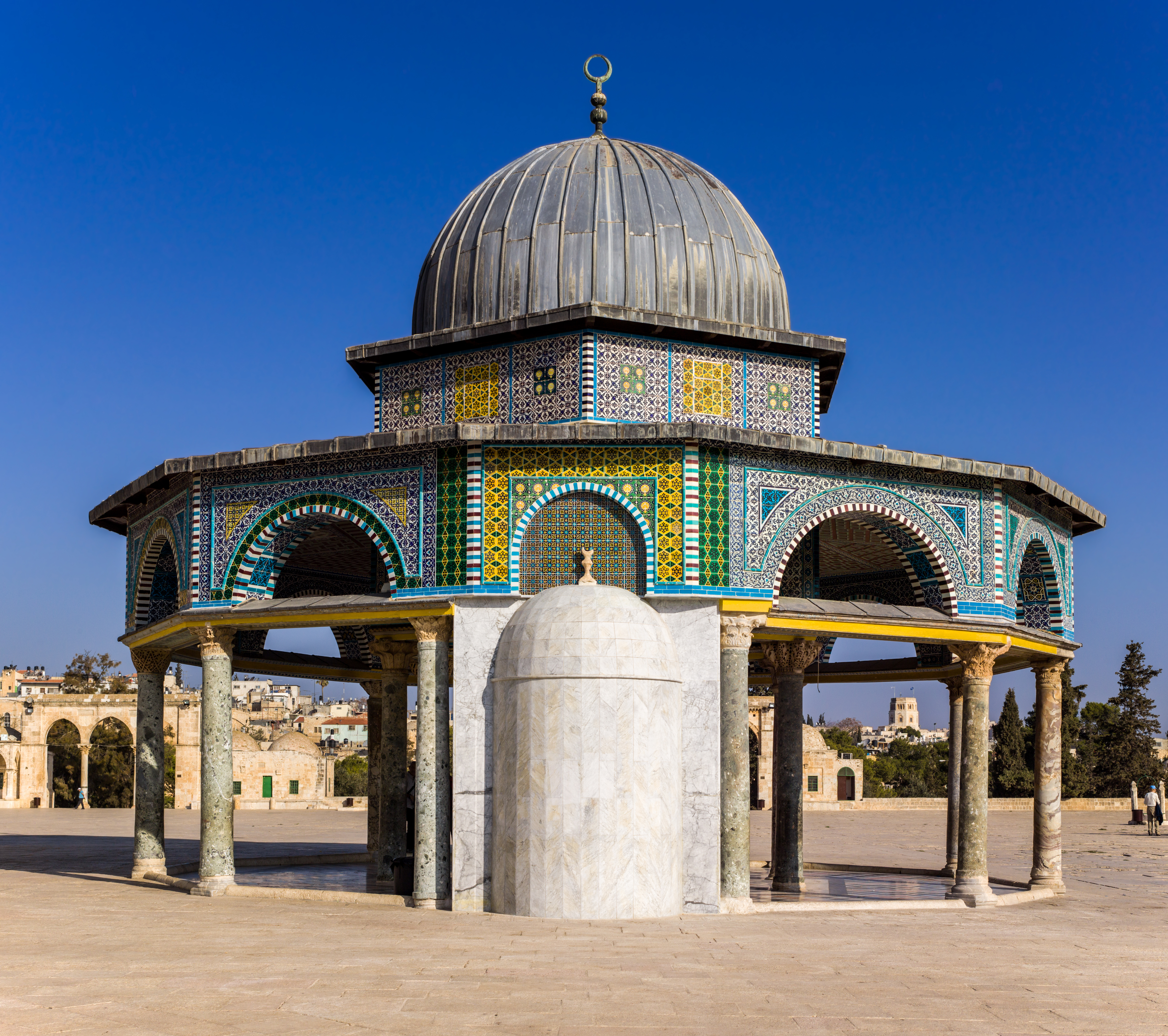
The smaller Dome of the Chain, erected in 691–92 CE,

Narratives by the medieval sources about Abd al-Malik's motivations in building the Dome of the Rock vary. At the time of its construction, the Caliph was engaged in war with Christian Byzantium and its Syrian Christian allies on the one hand and with the rival caliph Abd Allah ibn al-Zubayr, who controlled Mecca, the annual destination of Muslim pilgrimage, on the other hand. Thus, one series of explanations was that Abd al-Malik intended for the Dome of the Rock to be a religious monument of victory over the Christians that would distinguish Islam's uniqueness within the common Abrahamic religious setting of Jerusalem, home of the two older Abrahamic faiths, Judaism and Christianity. The historian Shelomo Dov Goitein has argued that the Dome of the Rock was intended to compete with the many fine buildings of worship of other religions: "The very form of a rotunda, given to the Qubbat as-Sakhra, although it was foreign to Islam, was destined to rival the many Christian domes" - and more specifically, the Church of the Holy Sepulchre, according to others.

The other main explanation holds that Abd al-Malik, in the heat of the war with Ibn al-Zubayr, sought to build the structure to divert the focus of the Muslims in his realm from the Ka'aba in Mecca, where Ibn al-Zubayr would publicly condemn the Umayyads during the annual pilgrimage to the sanctuary. Though most modern historians dismiss the latter account as a product of anti-Umayyad propaganda in the traditional Muslim sources and doubt that Abd al-Malik would attempt to alter the sacred Muslim requirement of fulfilling the pilgrimage to the Ka'aba, other historians concede that this cannot be conclusively dismissed.

=== Abbasids and Fatimids ===
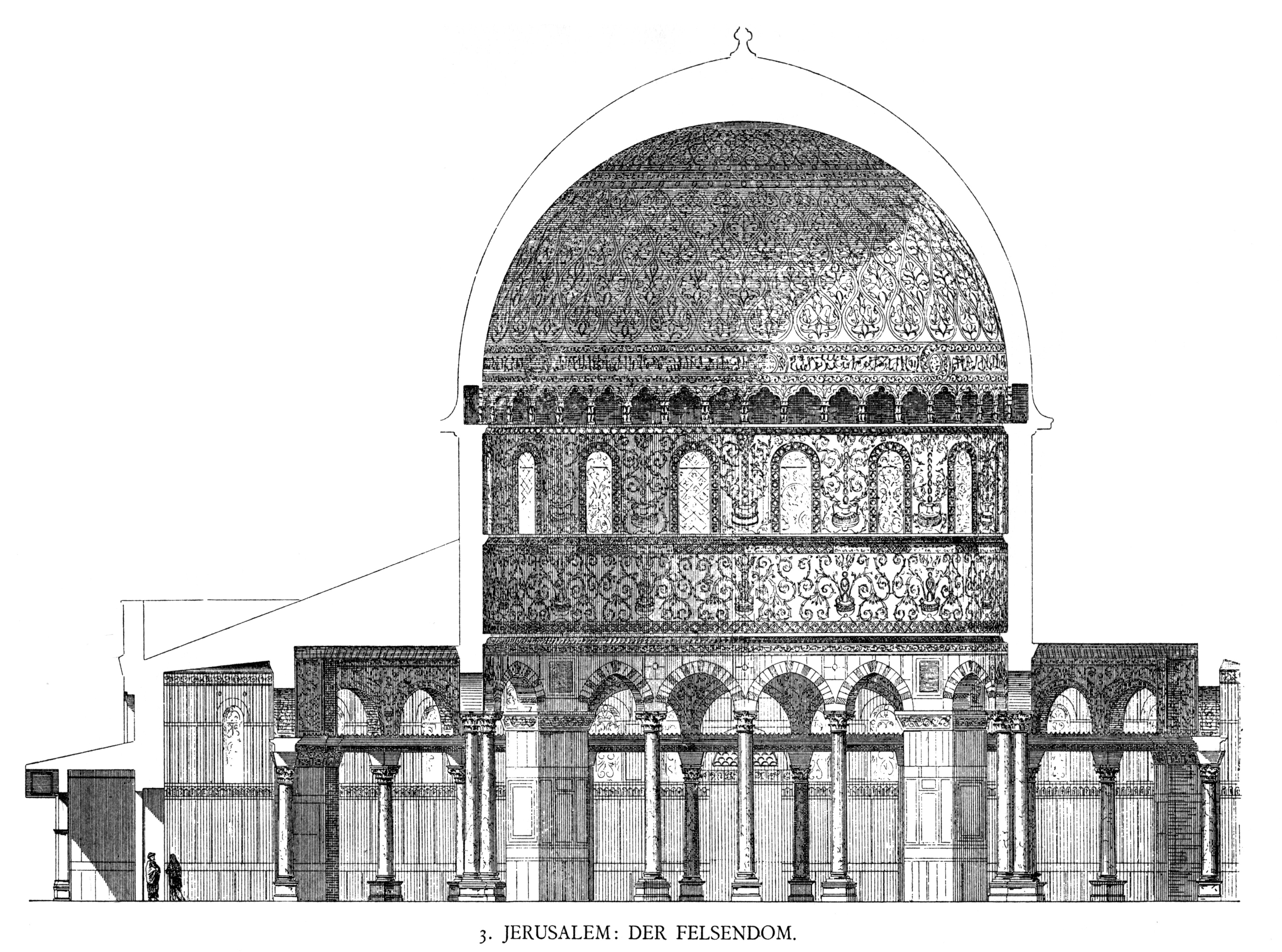
Cross section of the Dome (print from 1887, after the first detailed drawings of the Dome, made by the English artist Frederick Catherwood in 1833).

The building was severely damaged by earthquakes in 808 and again in 846. It was during the Abbasid renovations of the building that the inscription of the patron of the building Abd al-Malik was removed and replaced with the Abbasid Al-Ma'mun (r. 813–833) although the inscribed date 72 AH (692–693 CE) was not removed or altered.

The upper part of the dome collapsed in an earthquake in 1015 and was rebuilt in 1022–1023. The mosaics on the drum were repaired in 1027–1028. The earthquake of 1033 resulted in the introduction of wooden beams to reinforce the dome. These renovations and reconstructions were conducted during the reign of the Fatimid Al-Zahir (r. 1021–1036), who also rebuilt the Qibli (Al-Aqsa) Mosque. The Fatimid restorations are recorded by mosaic epitaphs on the inner dome dated to 413 AH (1022–23) and 418 (1027–28). The Qur'anic Throne Verse, inscribed in gilt silver, was observed by the Persian traveler Ali al-Harawi on the roof of the dome during the Crusader occupation. This inscription was most likely a renewed version of an earlier Umayyad inscription of the verse.

=== Crusaders ===
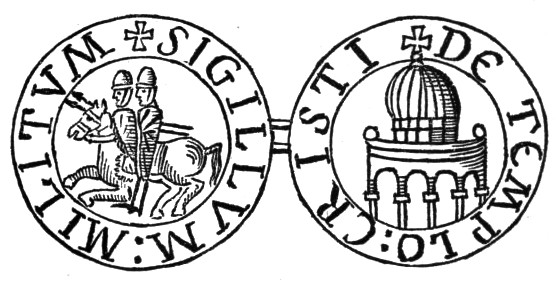
Depiction of the Templum Domini on the reverse side of the seal of the Knights Templar

Jerusalem was captured by Crusaders in 1099 at the end of the First Crusade. The Dome of the Rock was given to the Augustinians, who turned it into a church, while the nearby Al-Aqsa main prayer hall or Qibli Mosque first became a royal palace for a while, and then for much of the 12th century the headquarters of the Knights Templar. The Templars, active from c. 1119, identified the Dome of the Rock as the site of the Temple of Solomon. The Templum Domini, as they called the Dome of the Rock, featured on the official seals of the Order's Grand Masters (such as Everard des Barres and Renaud de Vichiers), and soon became the architectural model for round Templar churches across Europe.

=== Ayyubids and Mamluks ===
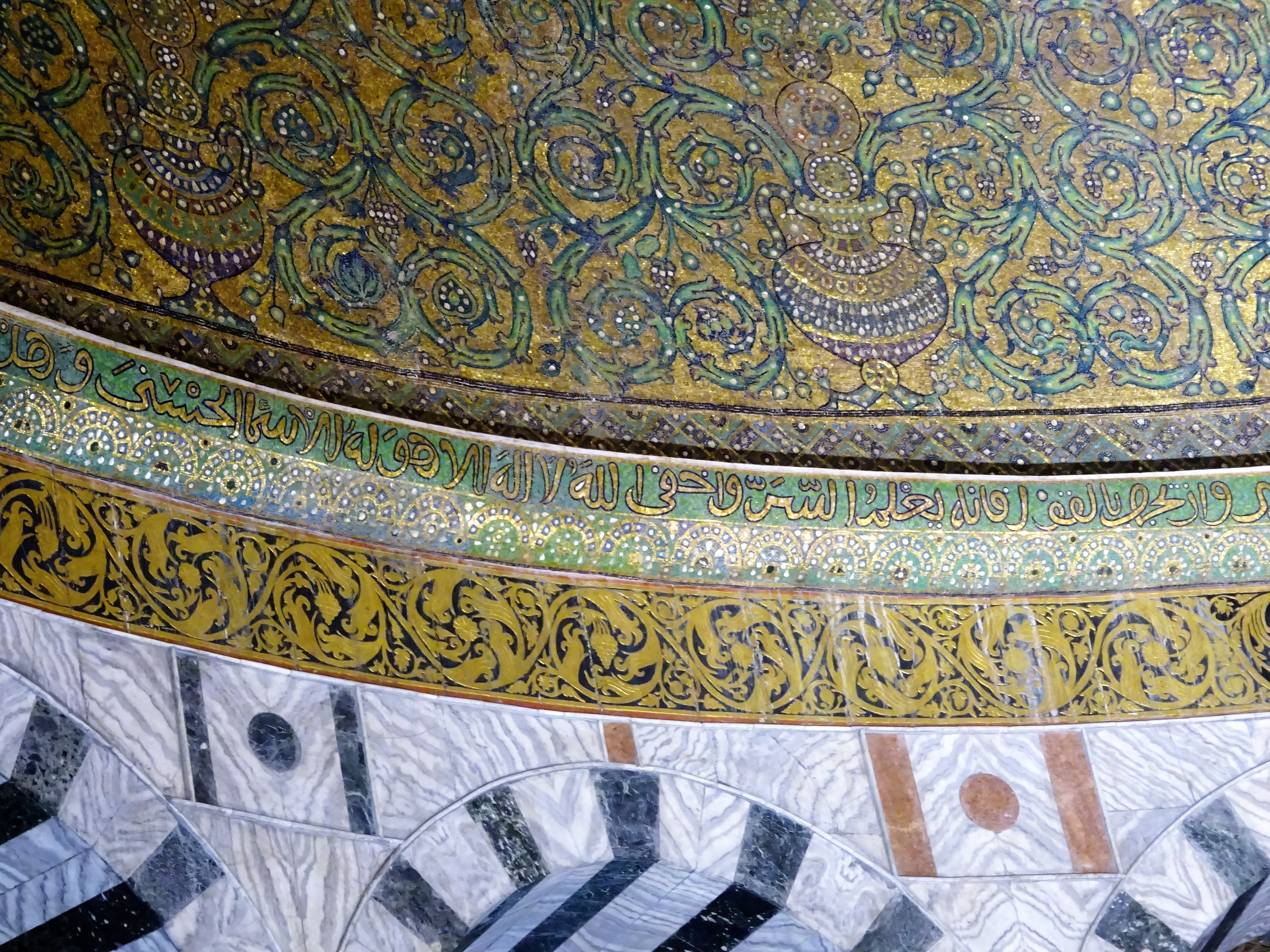
Cursive Arabic inscription along the lower edge of the dome's drum, dating to Ayyubid restorations, containing Qur'anic verses.

Jerusalem was recaptured by Saladin on 2 October 1187, he requested a complete restoration of Al-Aqsa and ordered the marble cover of the rock which was added by the crusaders to be removed. The Dome of the Rock was reconsecrated as a Muslim shrine. The cross on top of the dome was replaced by a crescent, and a wooden screen was placed around the rock below. Saladin's nephew al-Malik al-Mu'azzam Isa carried out other restorations within the building, and added the porch to the Jami'a Al-Aqsa.

As part of Saladin's restoration, a new inscription band consisting almost entirely of verses 1 to 21 of the 20th chapter (surah) of the Qur'an, Ta-Ha, were added along the inner face of the lower drum of the dome. Unlike earlier inscriptions, this one employs a cursive Arabic script which had only recently developed at the time. These verses are believed to have supplanted Latin inscriptions dating to the Crusader period, which may themselves have replaced an earlier Umayyad inscription. Saladin's restoration is still recorded explicitly in a later Ottoman inscription inside the dome, which gives the date of his restoration as 586 AH (1190 CE). Another inscription on a wooden screen inside the building, no longer present, also recorded the name of one of Saladin's sons and a date corresponding to 1199 CE.

The Temple Mount was the focus of extensive royal patronage by the sultans during the Mamluk period, which lasted from 1260 until 1516. The Dome of the Rock itself was not significantly modified. Sultan Baybars (r. 1260–1277) restored the exterior decoration. Al-Nasir Muhammad re-gilded the dome during his second reign (1299–1309). The current wooden ceiling of the outer ambulatory and its gilded decoration likely dates to another restoration by al-Nasir Muhammad during his third reign, around 1327–1328. The dome was severely damaged in 1447, possibly by lightning, and its western side had to be rebuilt.

=== Ottomans ===
During the Ottoman period, the reign of Suleiman the Magnificent (r. 1520–1566) brought Ottoman dynastic patronage to the city, around the same time that the sultan and his wife, Haseki Hürrem Sultan (Roxelana), were also commissioning works in the holy cities of Mecca and Medina. Suleiman initiated a major renovation of the Dome of the Rock. The most visible legacy of this work was the covering of the exterior with Ottoman-style tiles, which replaced the old Umayyad mosaics. This was likely part of an effort to impose a visibly Ottoman mark on this major Islamic holy site. Inscriptions on the tiles provide the dates 952 AH (1545–6 CE) and 959 AH (1552 CE), but work continued until the end of Suleiman's reign, if not later. Documents show repairs were still incomplete by the time of Murad III (r. 1574–1595) and the latter can probably be credited with finishing this work, which included repairs to the lead of the dome.

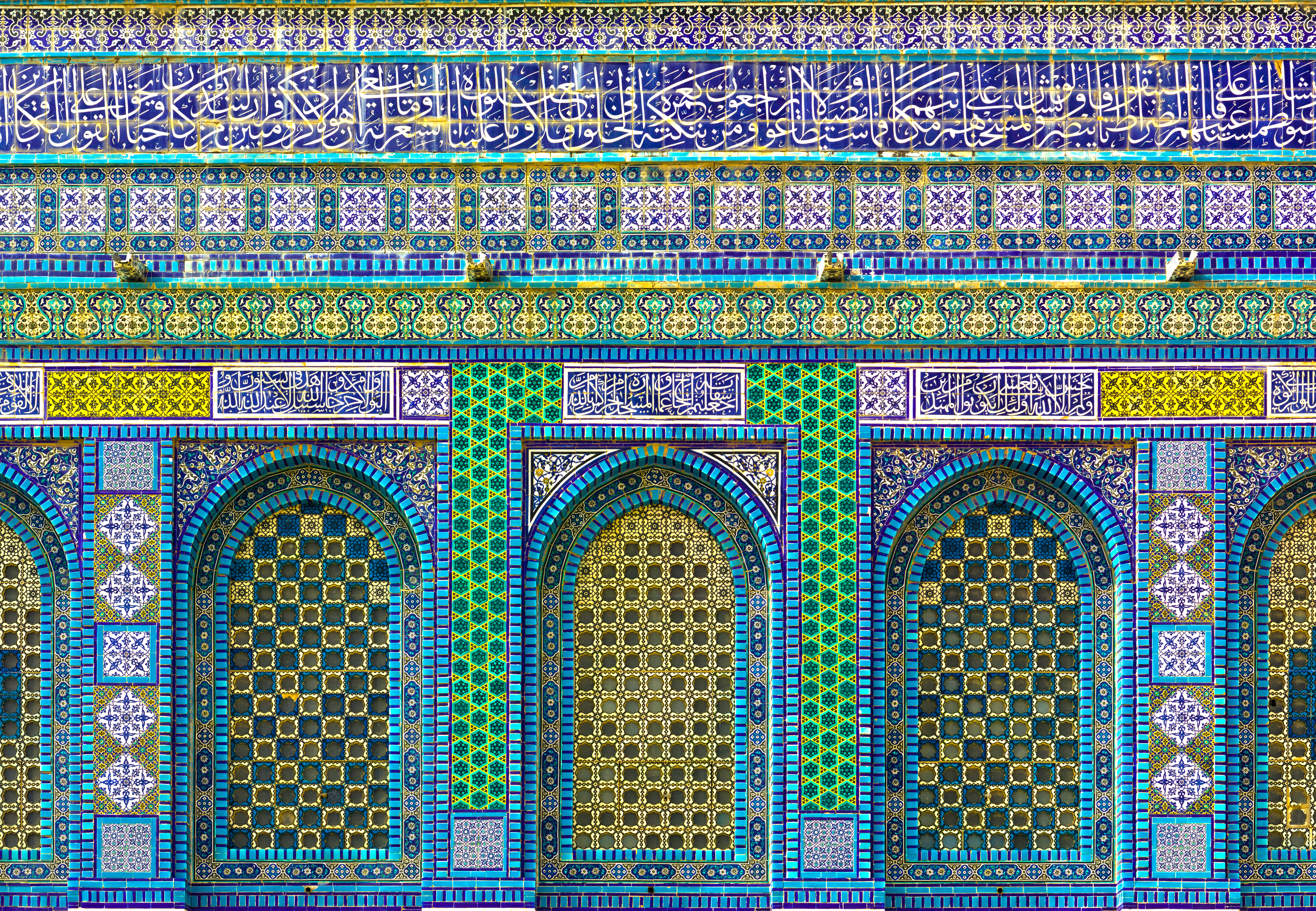
The exterior is covered in decorative tiles

The tiles seem to have been fabricated locally rather than at centers like Iznik (famous for its production of Iznik pottery at this time), although there does not appear to have been a sophisticated ceramic production center in the region. Robert Hillenbrand remarks that the workshops that produced the tiles must have been dedicated to this project alone, because there is no evidence that similar tilework was produced for other monuments in Jerusalem during this period. The name of one of the craftsmen is recorded in an inscription as Abdallah of Tabriz. This may indicate that the tiles were commissioned from a workshop of Iranian craftsmen from Tabriz who are thought to have produced many earlier Ottoman tiles.

The Dome of the Chain, a free-standing structure next to the Dome of the Rock, was also renovated as part of Suleiman's project, in 1561–2. Also nearby, the Ottomans built the Dome of the Prophet in its current form sometime in the 16th or 17th century.

Further restorations to the building are recorded in 1720–1721, 1742,1754, 1780, 1817–1818, and 1853. In another major restoration project undertaken in 1874–1875 during the reign of the Ottoman Sultan Abdülaziz, all the tiles on the west and southwest walls of the octagonal part of the building were removed and replaced by copies that had been made in Turkey.

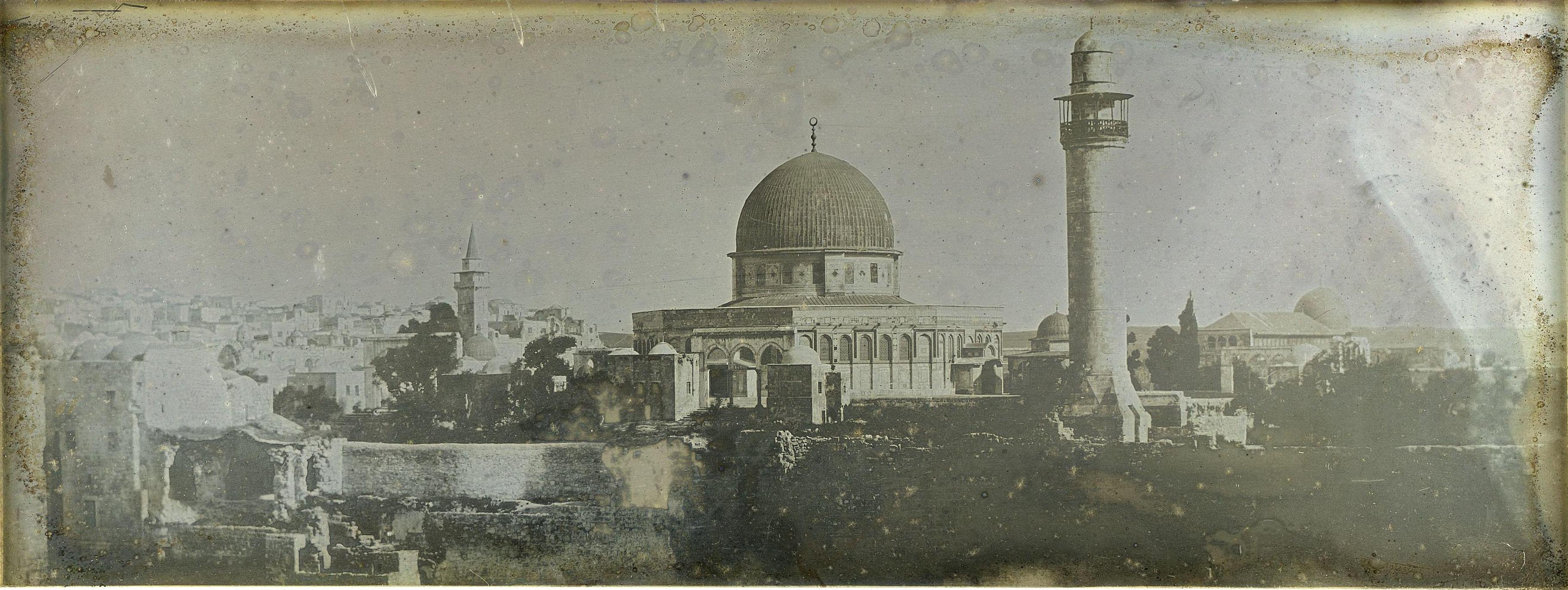
The first-ever photograph of the building, 1842–1844

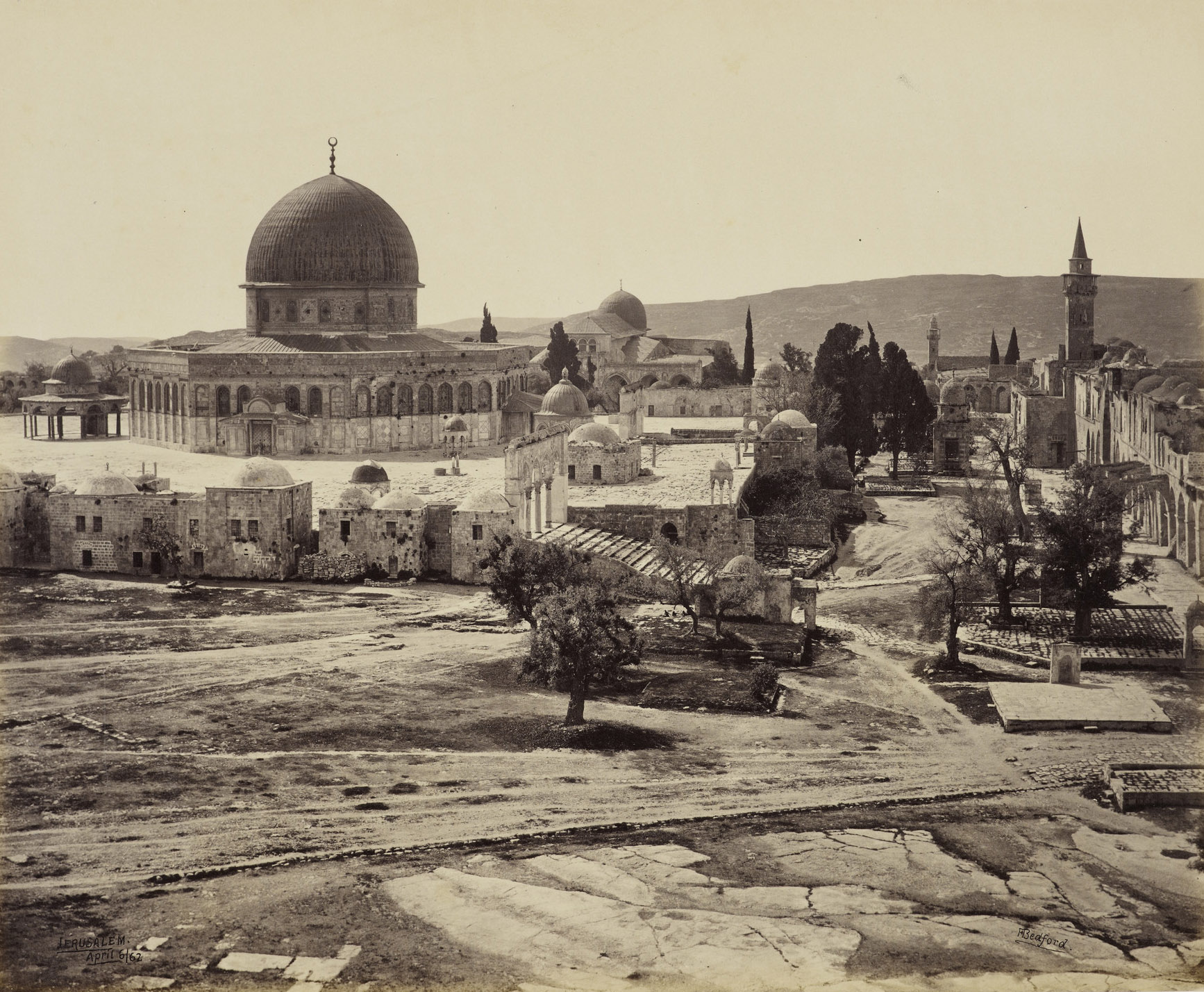
View from the north, Francis Bedford (1862)

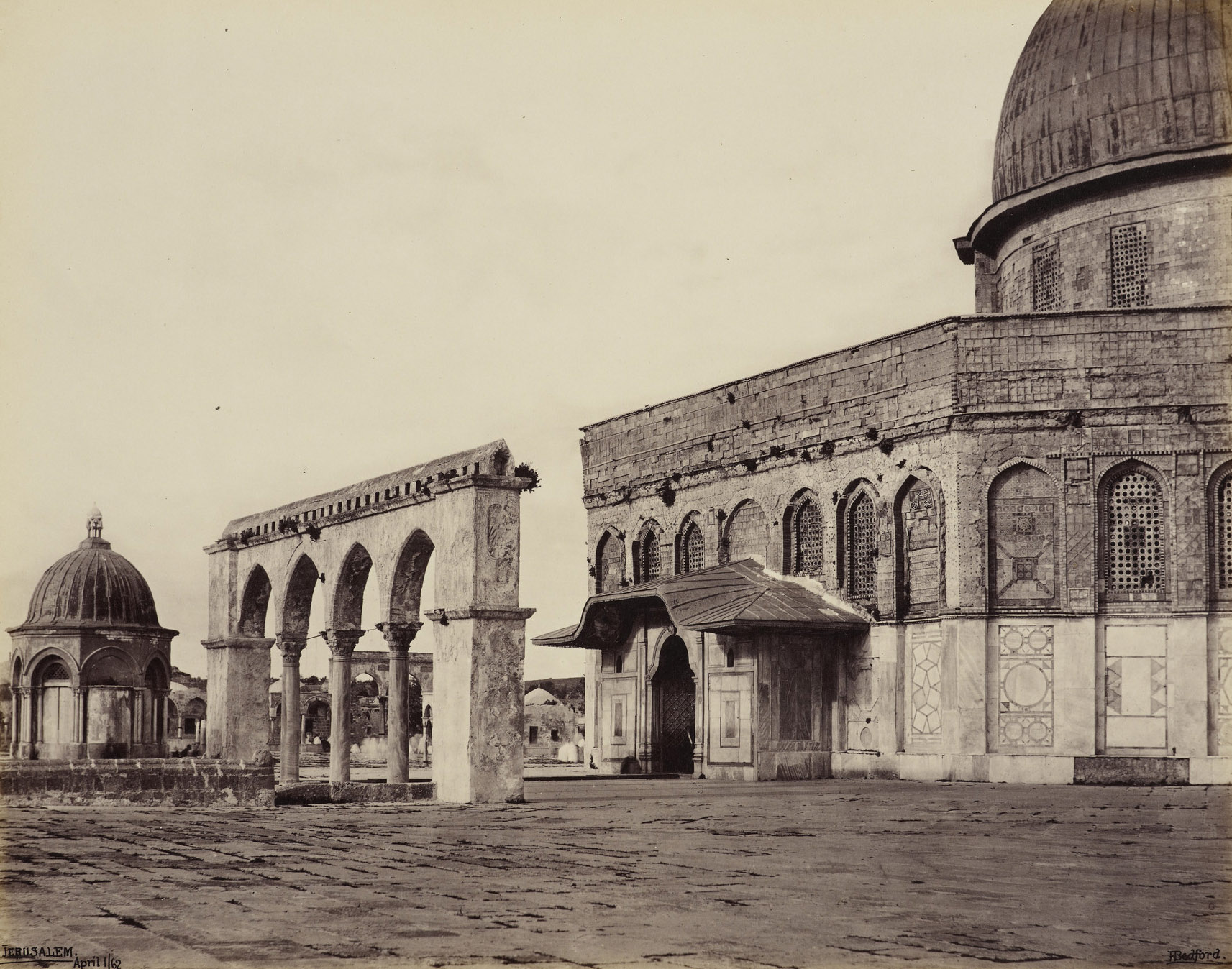
West front in 1862. By this date many of the 16th century tiles were missing.

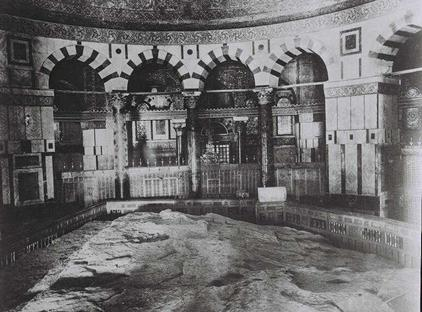
Interior showing rock (1915)

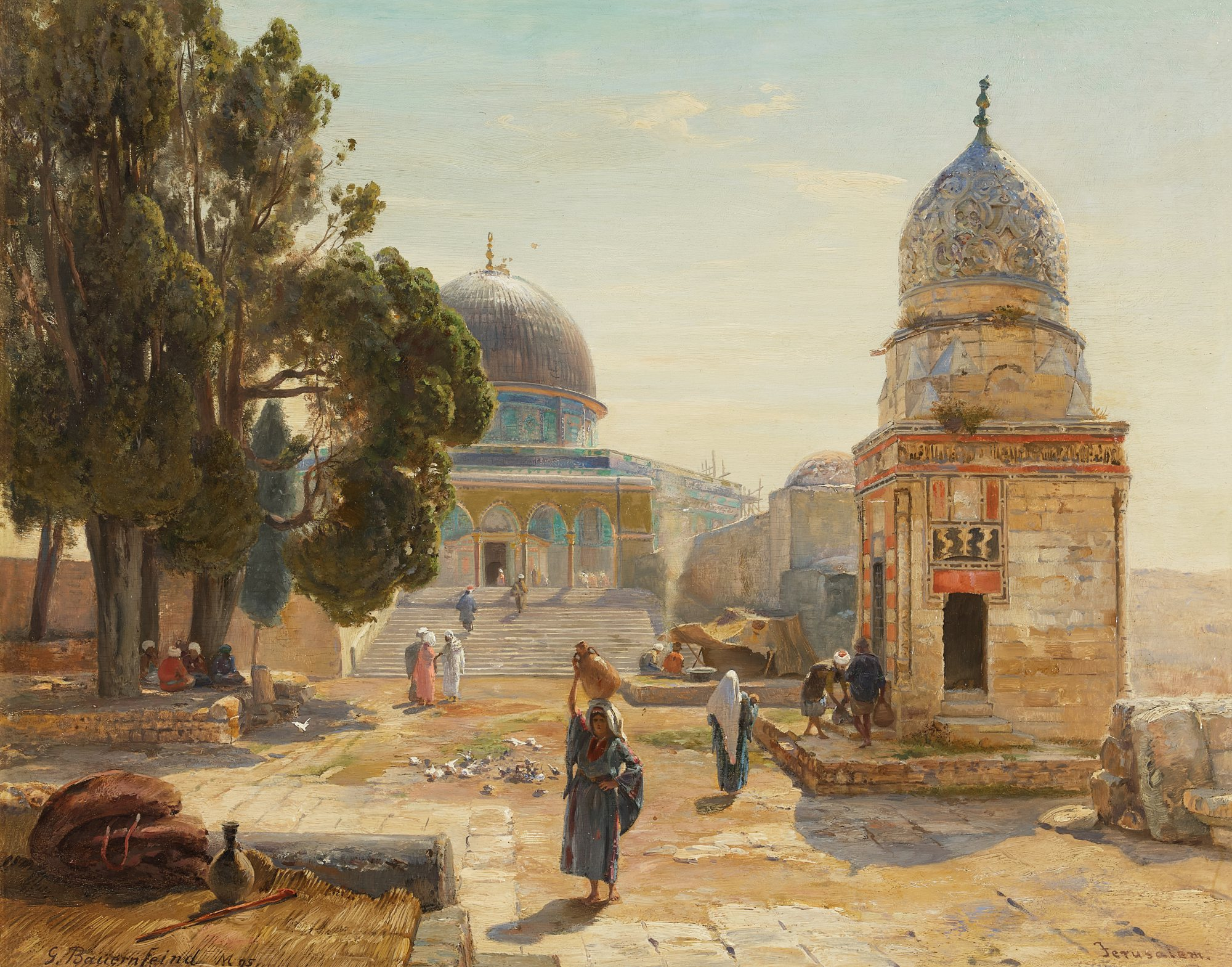
The Dome of the Rock and the Fountain of Qaitbay (late 19th Century) by Gustav Bauernfeind

=== British Mandate ===
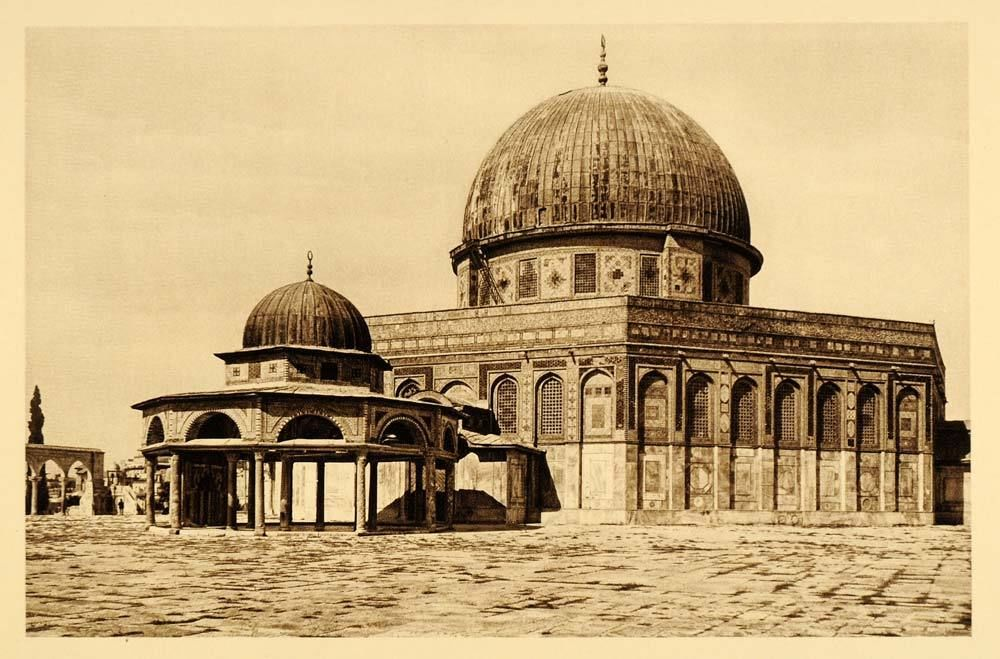
1920s photograph

Haj Amin al-Husseini, appointed Grand Mufti by the British in 1917, along with Yaqub al-Ghusayn, implemented the restoration of the Dome of the Rock and the Jami Al-Aqsa in Jerusalem.

Parts of the Dome of the Rock collapsed during the 11 July 1927 earthquake, and the walls were left badly cracked, damaging many of the repairs that had taken place over previous years.

=== Jordanian rule ===
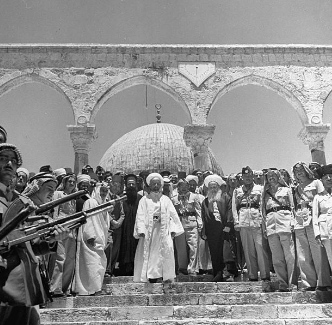
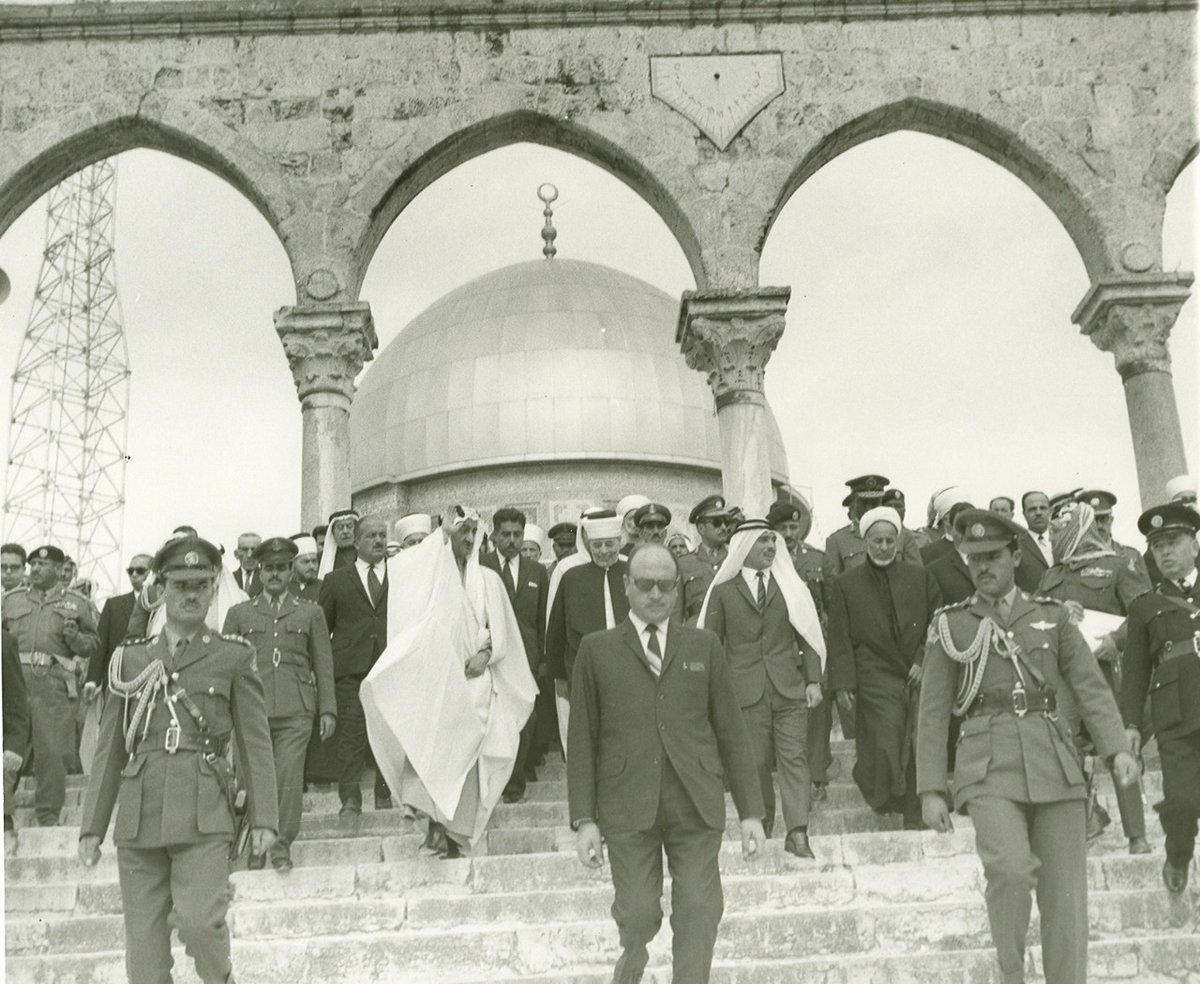
King Abdullah I of Jordan visiting Al-Aqsa Mosque compound in 1948 (left), and King Faisal of Saudi Arabia visiting in 1966 (right) with the Dome of the Rock visible in the background

Between 1959 and 1964, an extensive program of renovation was undertaken by the government of Jordan, with funds supplied by Arab governments and Turkey. The work included replacement of large numbers of tiles dating back to the reign of Suleiman the Magnificent, which had become dislodged by heavy rain. In 1965, as part of this restoration, the dome was covered with a durable aluminium bronze alloy made in Italy that replaced the lead exterior. Before 1959, the dome was covered in blackened lead. In the course of substantial restoration carried out from 1959 to 1962, the lead was replaced by aluminum-bronze plates covered with gold leaf.

=== Israeli rule ===
A few hours after the Israeli flag was hoisted over the Dome of the Rock in 1967 during the Six-Day War, Israelis lowered it on the orders of Moshe Dayan and invested the Muslim waqf (religious trust) with the authority to manage the Al-Aqsa in order to "keep the peace".

In 1993, the golden dome covering was refurbished following a donation of US$8.25 million by King Hussein of Jordan, who sold one of his houses in London to fund the 80 kilograms (180 lb) of gold required.

== Accessibility ==
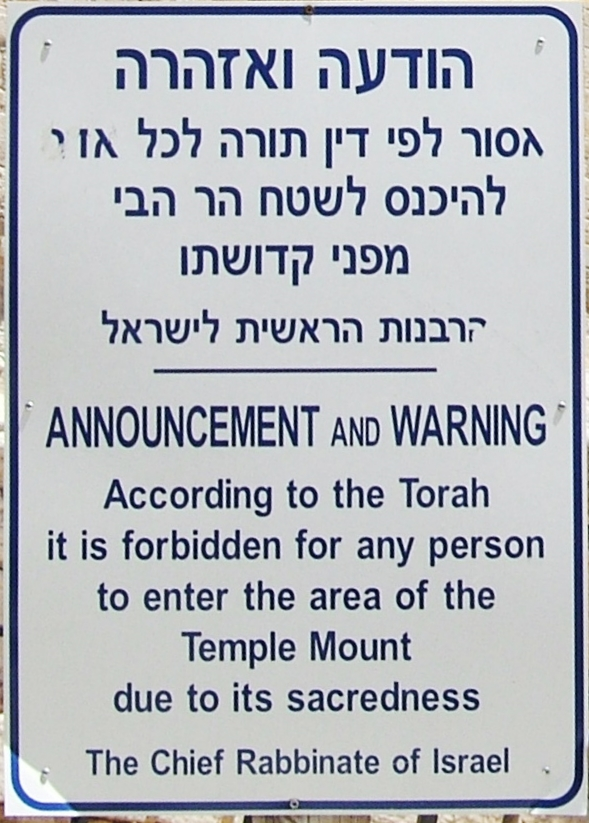
Sign at visitors entrance to Temple Mount (Al-Aqsa Compound)

The Dome is maintained by the Ministry of Awqaf in Amman, Jordan.

Until the mid-19th century, non-Muslims were barred from entering the compound. Under the arrangement known as the "Status Quo", non-Muslims are permitted to visit the site as tourists via the Mughrabi Gate during specific hours, but non-Muslim prayer and religious items are prohibited, with restrictions enforced by Israeli police, since the occupation of East Jerusalem (including its Old City which includes Al-Aqsa) in 1967 by the Israeli army. Access for Palestinians from the West Bank and Gaza is governed by Israel's permit system, and is frequently restricted by Israeli authorities.

While the Chief Rabbinate of Israel maintains a formal ban on Jews entering any part of the site, a growing number of rabbis permit visiting its peripheral areas, though all rabbinic authorities strictly forbid entry into the actual Dome of the Rock shrine itself. Consequently, annual Jewish visitation to the compound grounds has increased, with the Temple Mount advocacy organization Beyadenu reporting a record 68,944 visitors in 2026.

== Religious significance ==
The location of the Dome of the Rock is believed by many Muslims to be the site mentioned in Sura 17 of the Qur'an, which tells the story of the Isra and Mi'raj, the mythical Night Journey of Muhammad from the Great Mosque of Mecca to the Masjid Al-Aqsa ("the farthest place of prayer") where he prayed, and then to visit heaven where he leads prayers and rises to heaven to receive instructions from Allah. Although the city of Jerusalem is not mentioned by any of its names in the Qur'an, it is mentioned in hadiths as the place of Muhammad's Night Journey.

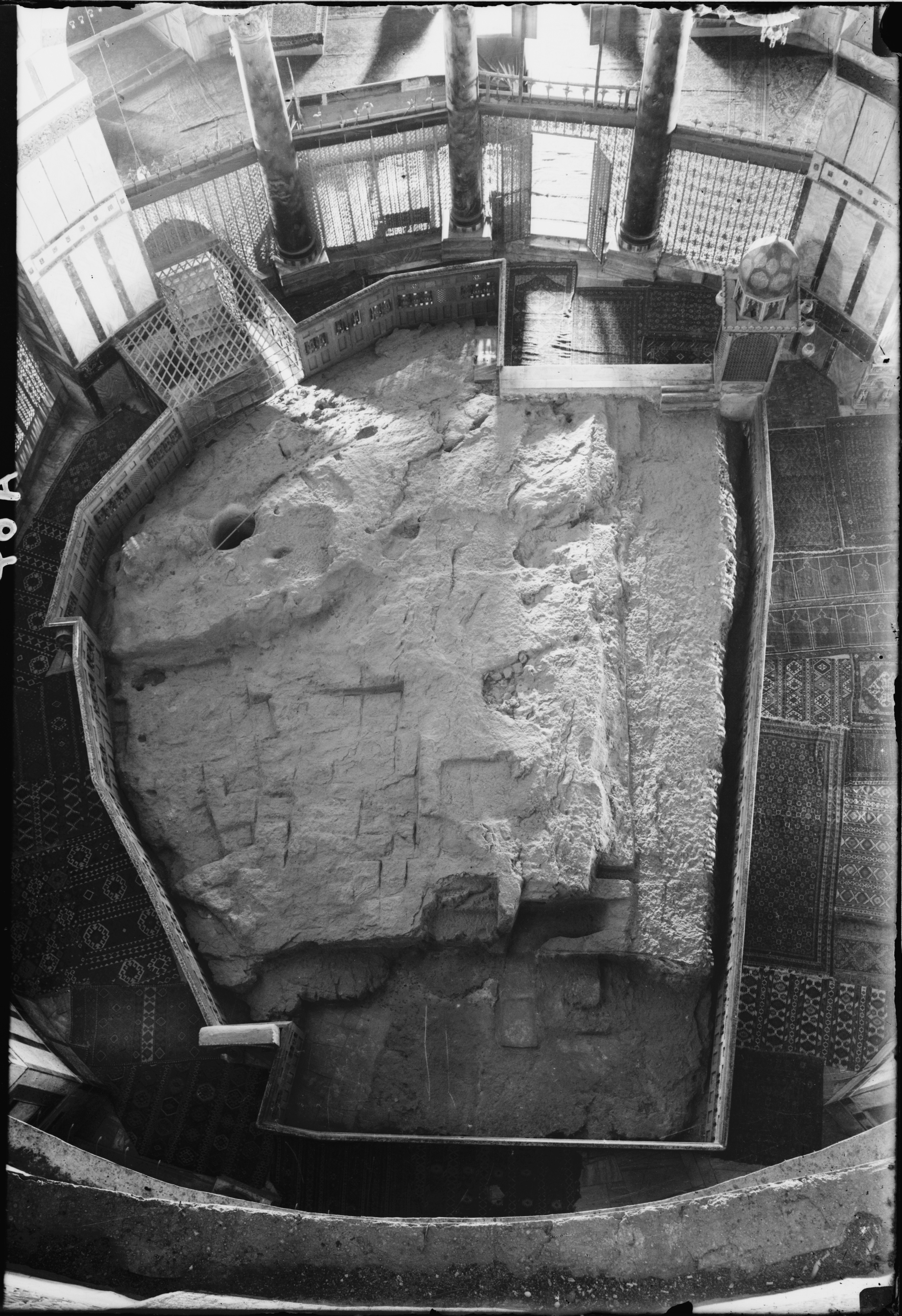
The Foundation Stone viewed from the dome. Photograph was taken between 1900 and 1920, before the removal of the surrounding iron grill. The entrance to the Well of Souls can be seen on the top-left side.

Judging though by the early Muslim sources, this does not seem to have been yet a fully formulated part of the beliefs shared by Muslims during the construction of the Dome in the 8th century, and the inscriptions inside the dome attributing the building to Caliph 'Abd al-Malik in the year 691/2 do not refer at all to the Night Journey, but contain only the Quranic view on the nature of the prophet Isa (Jesus) instead. The inscription is in a mosaic frieze that includes an explicit rejection of the divinity of Christ:

33. "So peace is upon me the day I was born, and the day I die, and the day I shall be raised alive!" 34. Such is Jesus, son of Mary. It is a statement of truth, about which they doubt. 35. It is not befitting to (the majesty of) Allah that He should take himself a child. Glory be to Him! when He determines a matter, He only says to it, "Be", and it is.

— Quran, 19:33–35

According to Goitein, the inscriptions decorating the interior clearly display a spirit of polemic against Christianity, whilst stressing at the same time the Qur'anic doctrine that Jesus was a true prophet. The formula la sharika lahu ('God has no companion') is repeated five times; the verses from Sura Maryam 19:35–37, which strongly reaffirm Jesus' prophethood to God, are quoted together with the prayer: Allahumma salli ala rasulika wa'abdika 'Isa bin Maryam – "O Lord, send your blessings to your Prophet and Servant Jesus son of Mary." He believes that this shows that rivalry with Christendom, together with the spirit of Muslim mission to the Christians, was at work at the time of construction.

At the beginning of the 8th century, Ibn Ishaq codified the earliest Arabic source pertaining to the Jerusalem Rock, as part of his Sirat al-Nabi, a biography of the Islamic prophet Muhammad, introducing the notion that right after his Night Journey from Mecca to Jerusalem (isra'), he set off immediately and specifically from the Rock in his Ascension (mi'raj) to Heaven, where God instructed him in the doctrines of the new religion.

Today, many Muslims believe the Dome serves for the commemoration of Muhammad's Ascension, in accordance to the views shared by some Islamic scholars, that the Rock is indeed the spot from which Muhammad ascended to Heaven accompanied by the angel Gabriel. Further, Muhammad was taken here by Gabriel to pray with Abraham, Moses, and Jesus.

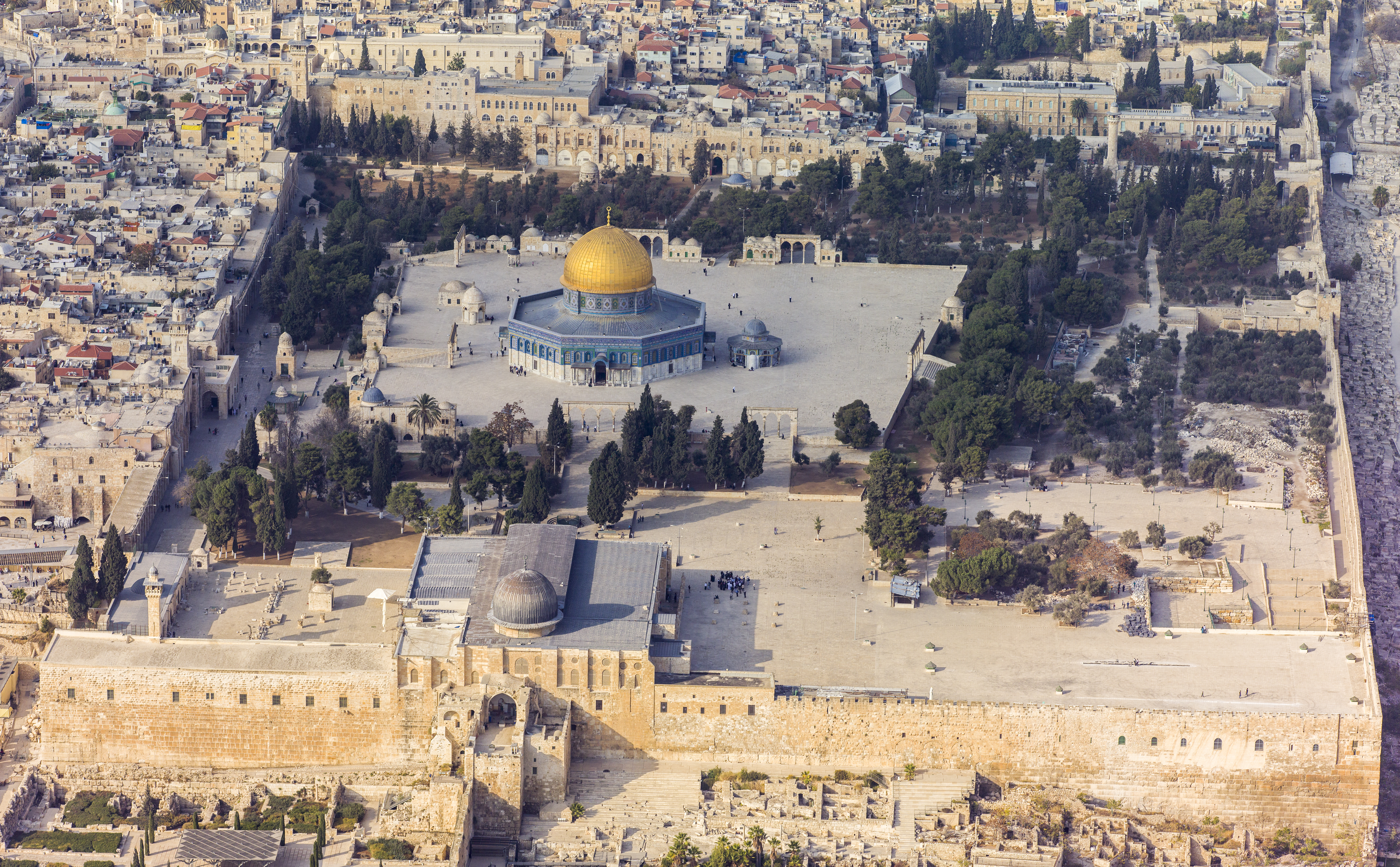
The Dome of the Rock, located at the center of the Al-Aqsa Mosque Compound (Al-Masjid al-Aqsa), whose sanctity is affirmed in both the Quran and the Hadith

Other Islamic scholars believe that Muhammad ascended to Heaven from the Masjid Al-Aqsa, of which the Dome of the Rock is a part.

Though Muslims now pray towards the Kaaba at Mecca, they once faced the Temple Mount as the Jews do; Islamic tradition holds that Muhammad led prayers towards Jerusalem until the 16th or 17th month after his migration from Mecca to Medina, when Allah directed him to instead turn towards the Kaaba in Mecca.

The Temple Institute wishes to relocate the Dome to another site and replace it with a Third Temple, a vision in line with the New Jerusalem prophecy. Some religious Jews, following rabbinic teaching, believe that the Temple should only be rebuilt in the messianic era, and that it would be presumptuous of people to force God's hand. However, some Evangelical Christians consider rebuilding of the Temple to be a prerequisite to Armageddon and the Second Coming. Jeremy Gimpel, a US-born candidate for The Jewish Home political party in the 2013 Israeli elections, caused a controversy when he was recorded telling a Fellowship Church evangelical group in Florida in 2011 to imagine the incredible experience that would follow were the Dome to be destroyed and the construction of the Third Temple begun. All evangelicals would immediately rush to go to Israel, he opined.

== Influence and depiction ==
=== Homages in art and architecture ===
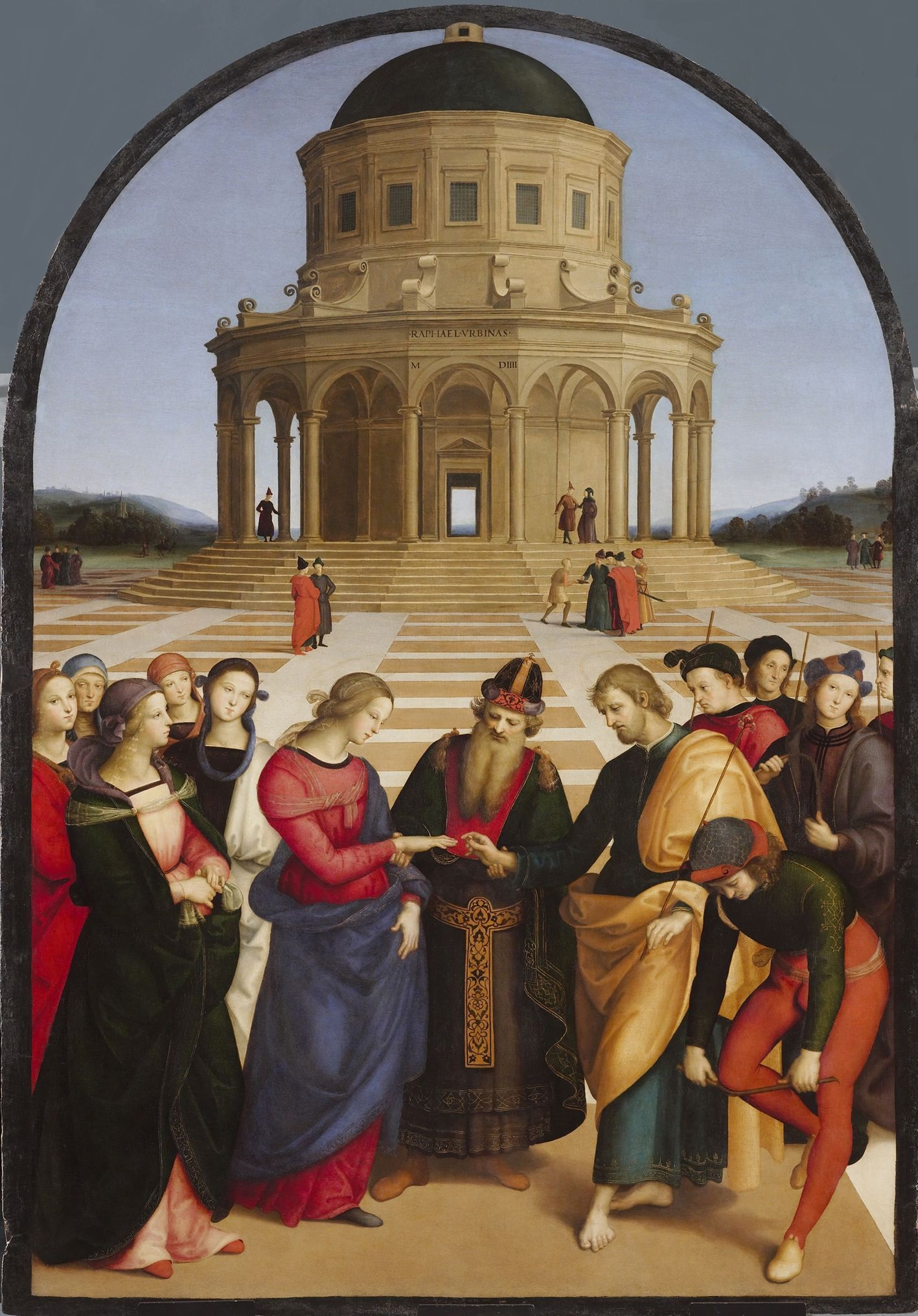
Raphael, The Marriage of the Virgin

It was long believed that the Dome of the Rock echoed the architecture of the Temple in Jerusalem, as can be seen in Raphael's The Marriage of the Virgin and in Perugino's Marriage of the Virgin.

For the same reason, the Dome of the Rock has inspired the architecture of a number of buildings. These include the 15th-century octagonal Church of St. Giacomo in Italy, the 19th-century octagonal Moorish Revival-style Rumbach Street Synagogue in Budapest, as well as the Mausoleum of Sultan Suleiman the Magnificent in Istanbul and the New Synagogue in Berlin, Germany.

=== On banknotes ===
The Dome of the Rock has been depicted on the obverse and reverse of several Middle Eastern currencies:

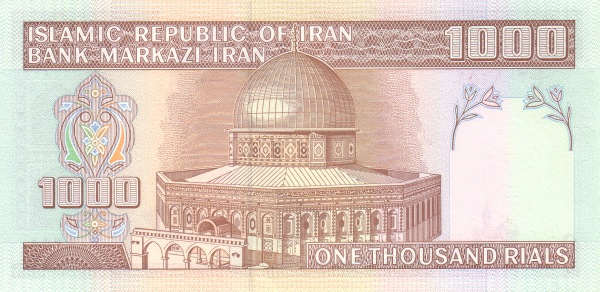
Reverse of a 1,000 Iranian rial banknote (1992).

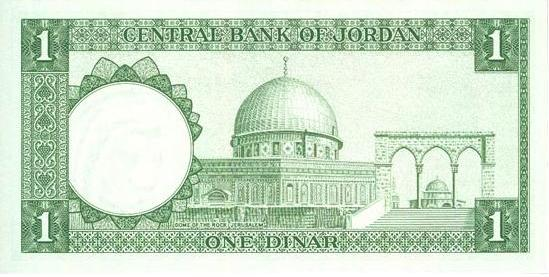
Reverse of a 1 Jordanian dinar banknote (1959). Since 1992, the 20 dinar note bears the Dome's depiction.

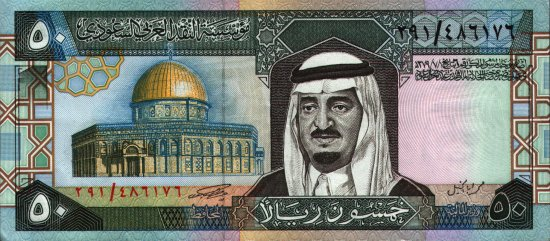
Obverse of a 50 Saudi riyal banknote (1983).

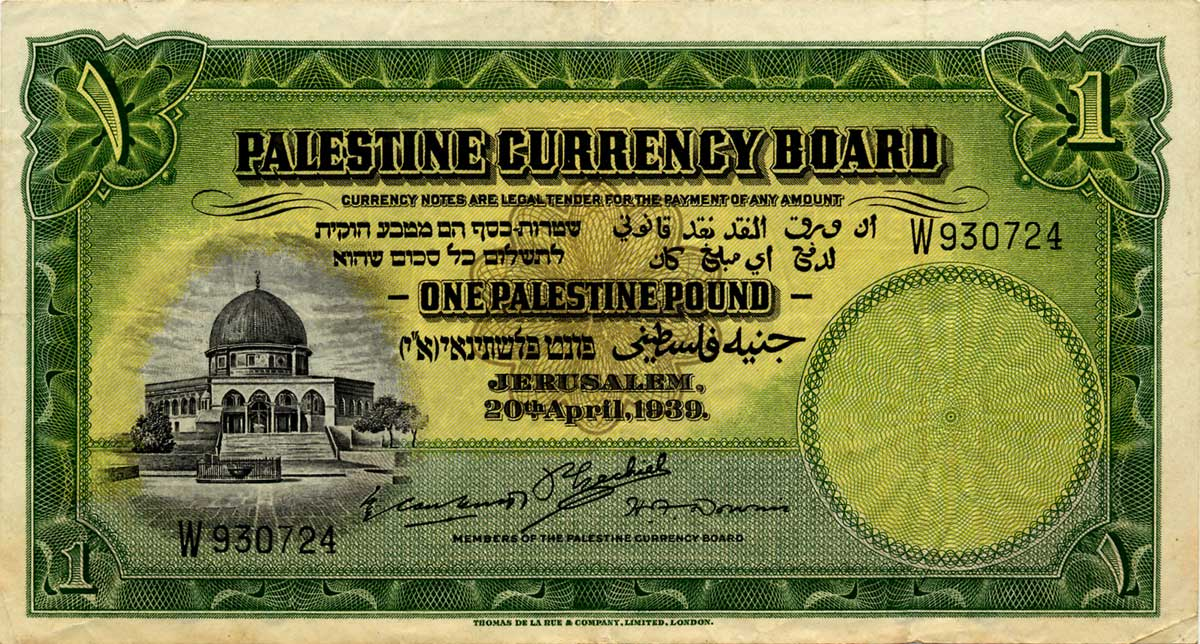
Obverse of a 1 Palestinian pound banknote (1939).

== See also ==
- Early medieval domes
- Symbolism of domes
