= Vasat Atik Ali Pasha Mosque =

Mosque in Fatih, Istanbul, Turkey

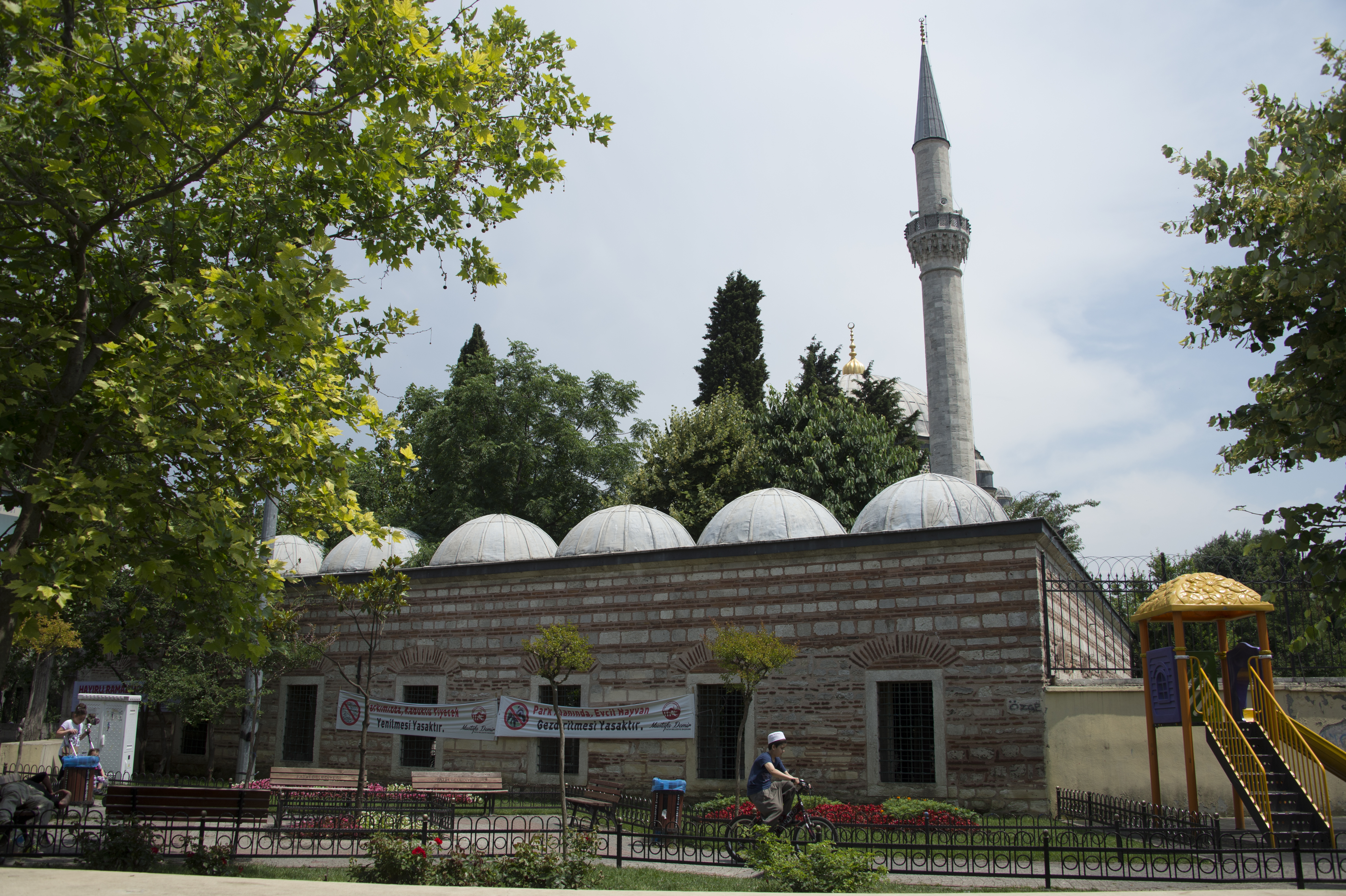

- Location in the Fatih district of Istanbul

Religion
- Affiliation: Islam

Location
- Location: Karagümrük, Fatih, Istanbul, Turkey
- Coordinates: 41.024969°N 28.941674°E

Architecture
- Type: Mosque
- Style: Ottoman architecture
- Groundbreaking: 1502
- Completed: 1512

Specifications
- Dome: 6
- Minaret: 1

Vasat Atik Ali Pasha Mosque (Turkish: Vasat Atik Ali Paşa Camii), also known as Zincirlikuyu Mosque (Turkish: Zincirlikuyu Camii) or Karagümrük Mosque, is an Ottoman mosque located in the Karagümrük neighbourhood of the Fatih district in Istanbul, Turkey, on Fevzipaşa Street. Sultan Bayezid II's grand vizier Hadım Atik Ali Pasha, after whom the mosque is named, ordered its construction in 1502, and it was completed in 1512, one year after the grand vizier's death.

The mosque is one of only two mosques in Istanbul with multiple domes, the other being Piyale Pasha Mosque, both having six domes. The mosque was known as Zincirlikuyu Mosque for a long time because of its location next to a well known as Zincirlikuyu (zincirli "chained", kuyu "well").

The minaret of the mosque collapsed in June 1648 after an earthquake. In 2013, repairs began on the minaret at a cost of 2.2 million TL ($1.03 million), expected to be completed in 2014. Pictures in the gallery that were taken in 2015 show the restoration is finished.

== Gallery ==
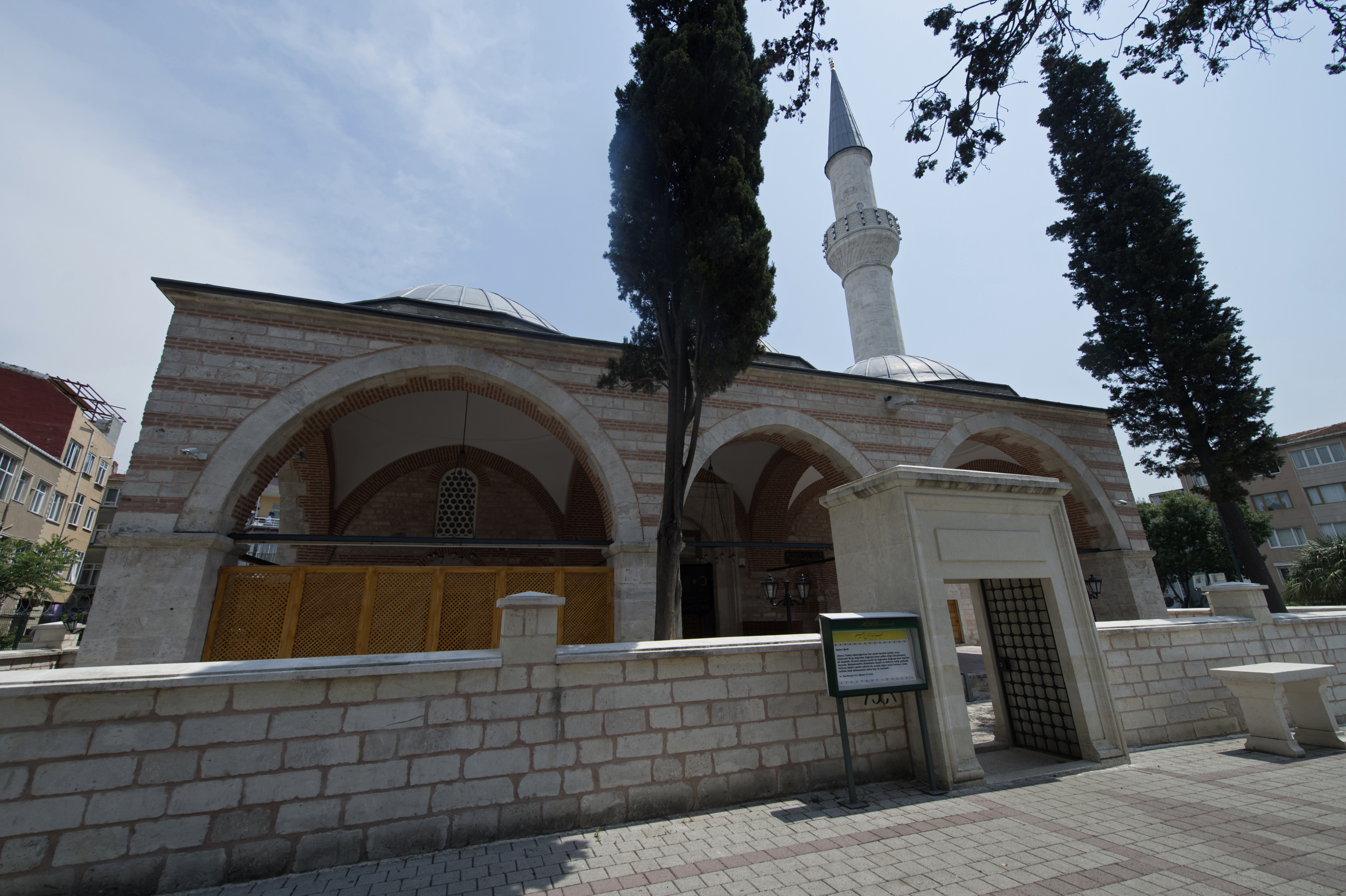
Zincirlikuyu Mosque front

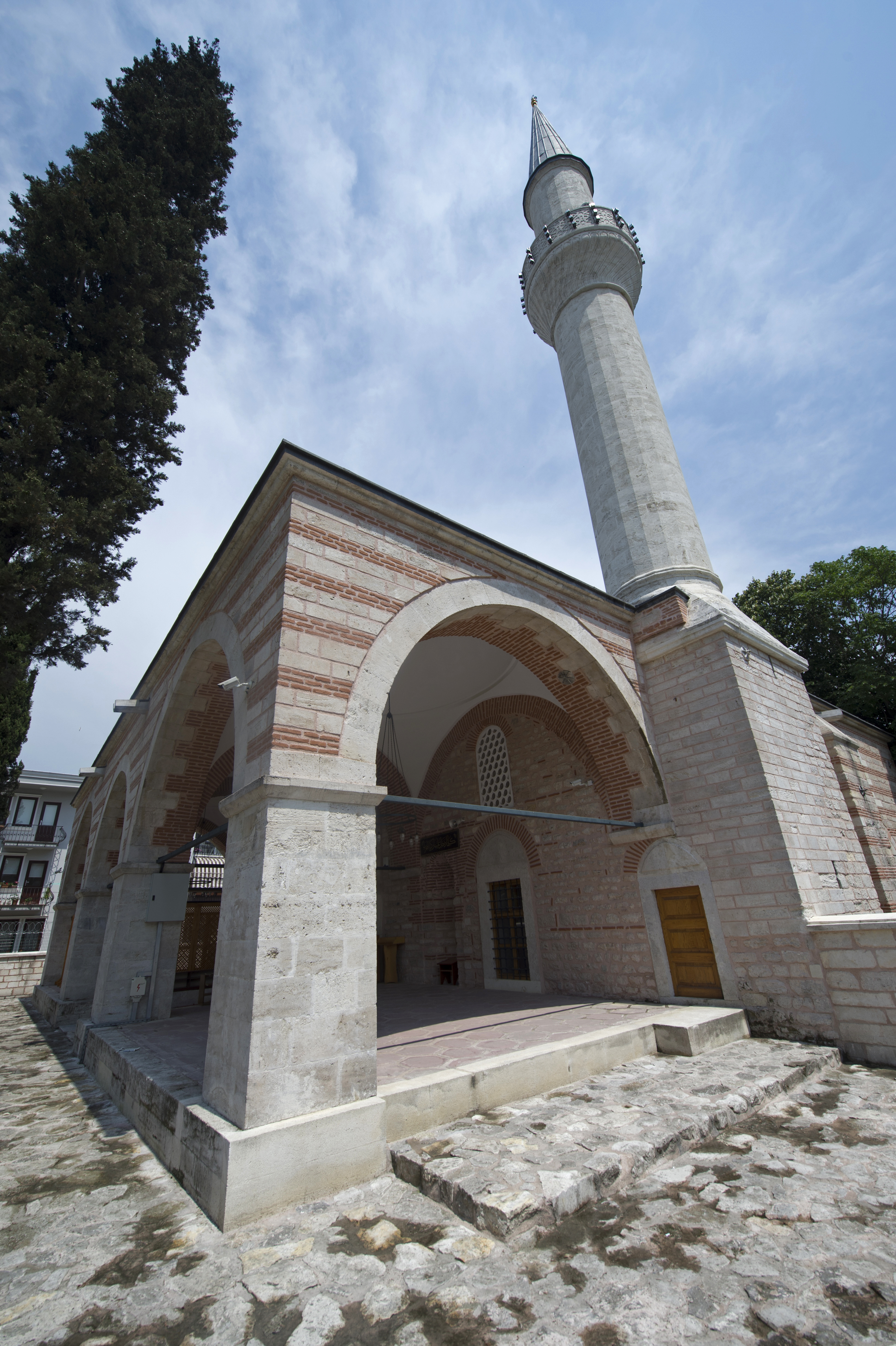
Zincirlikuyu Mosque from aside

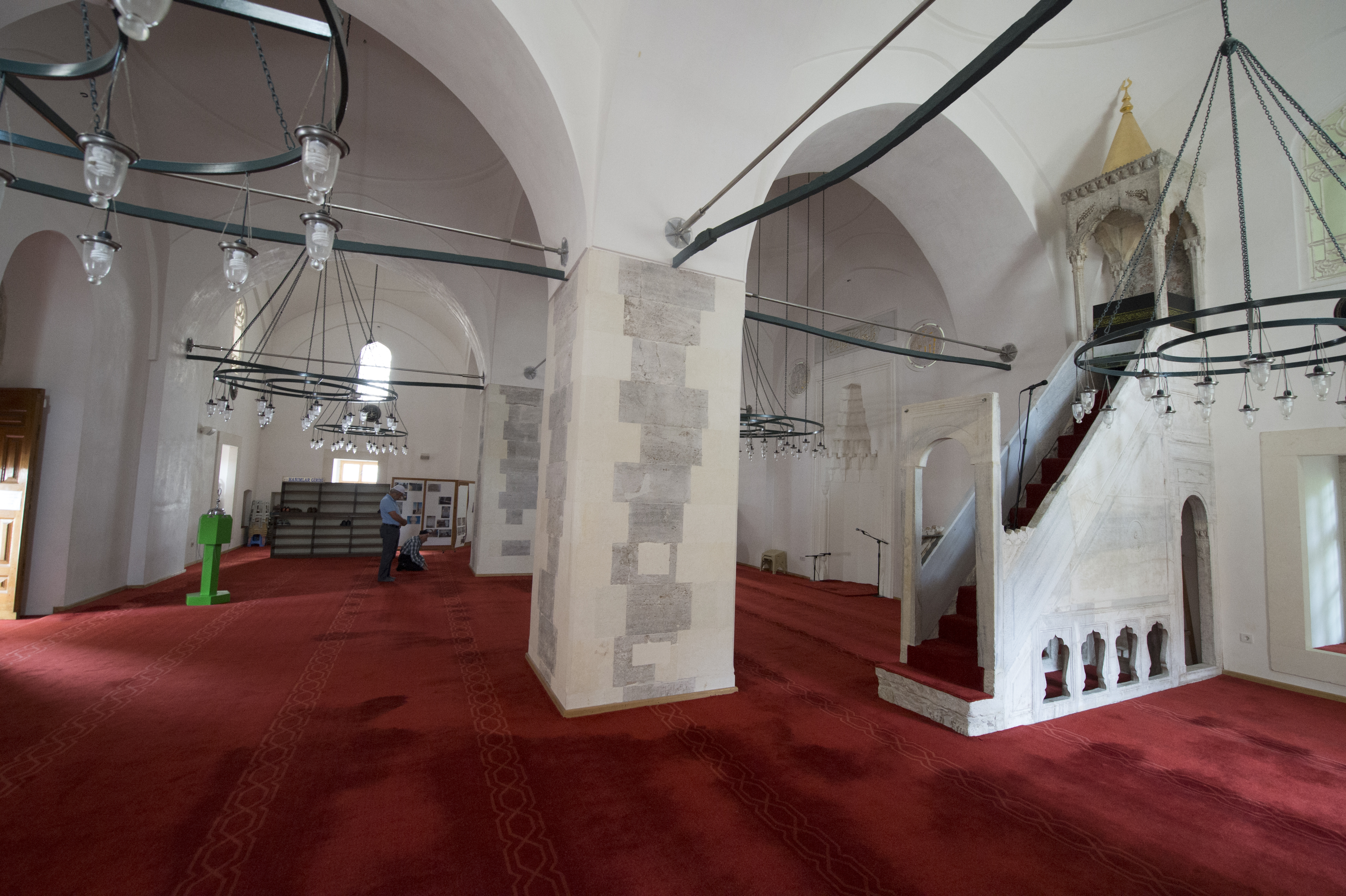
Zincirlikuyu Mosque interior

== See also ==
- List of mosques in Turkey
- Ottoman architecture
