= Piyale Pasha Mosque =

Ottoman mosque in Kasımpaşa, Istanbul, Turkey

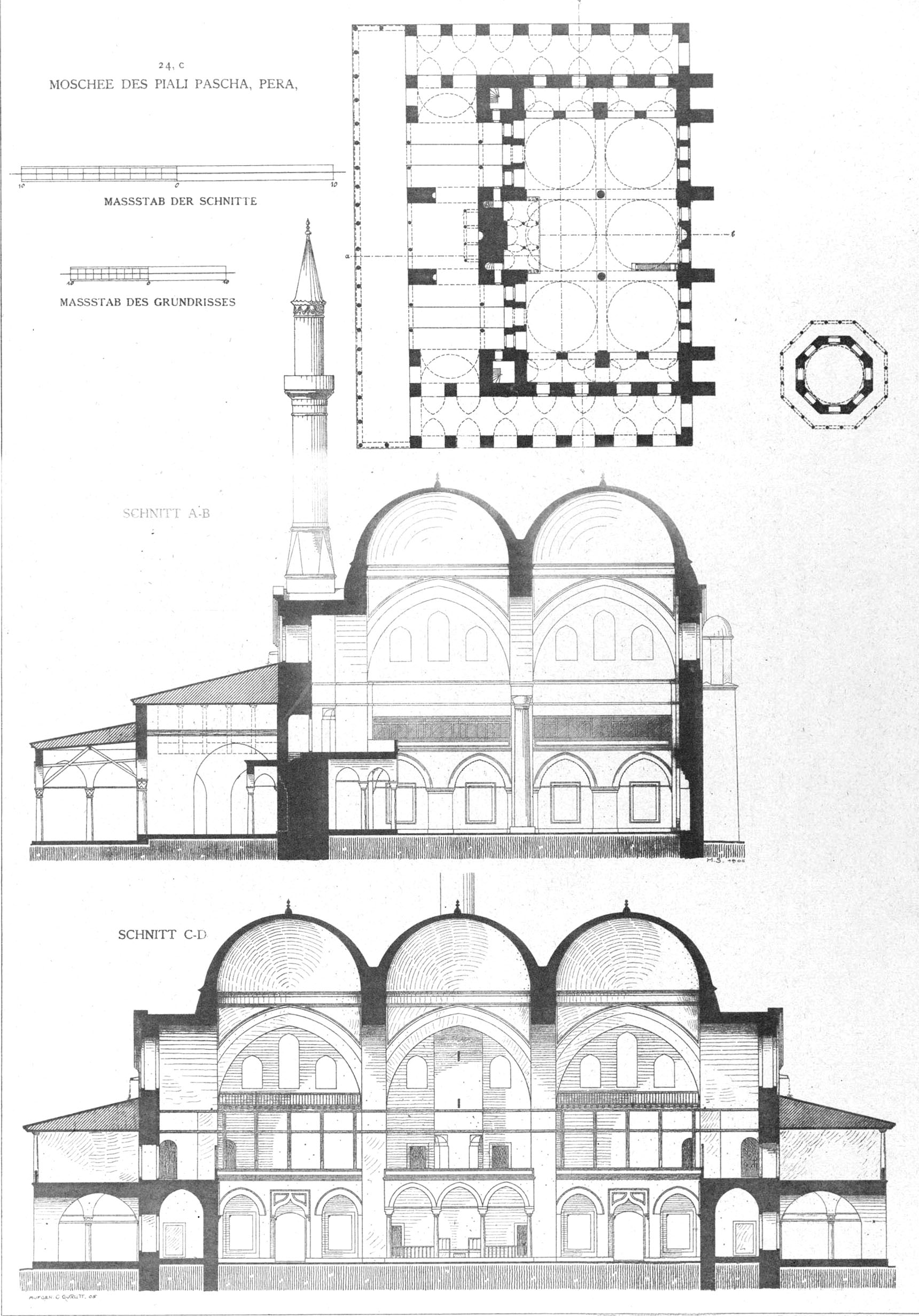
- Cross sections and plan of the mosque published by Cornelius Gurlitt in 1912

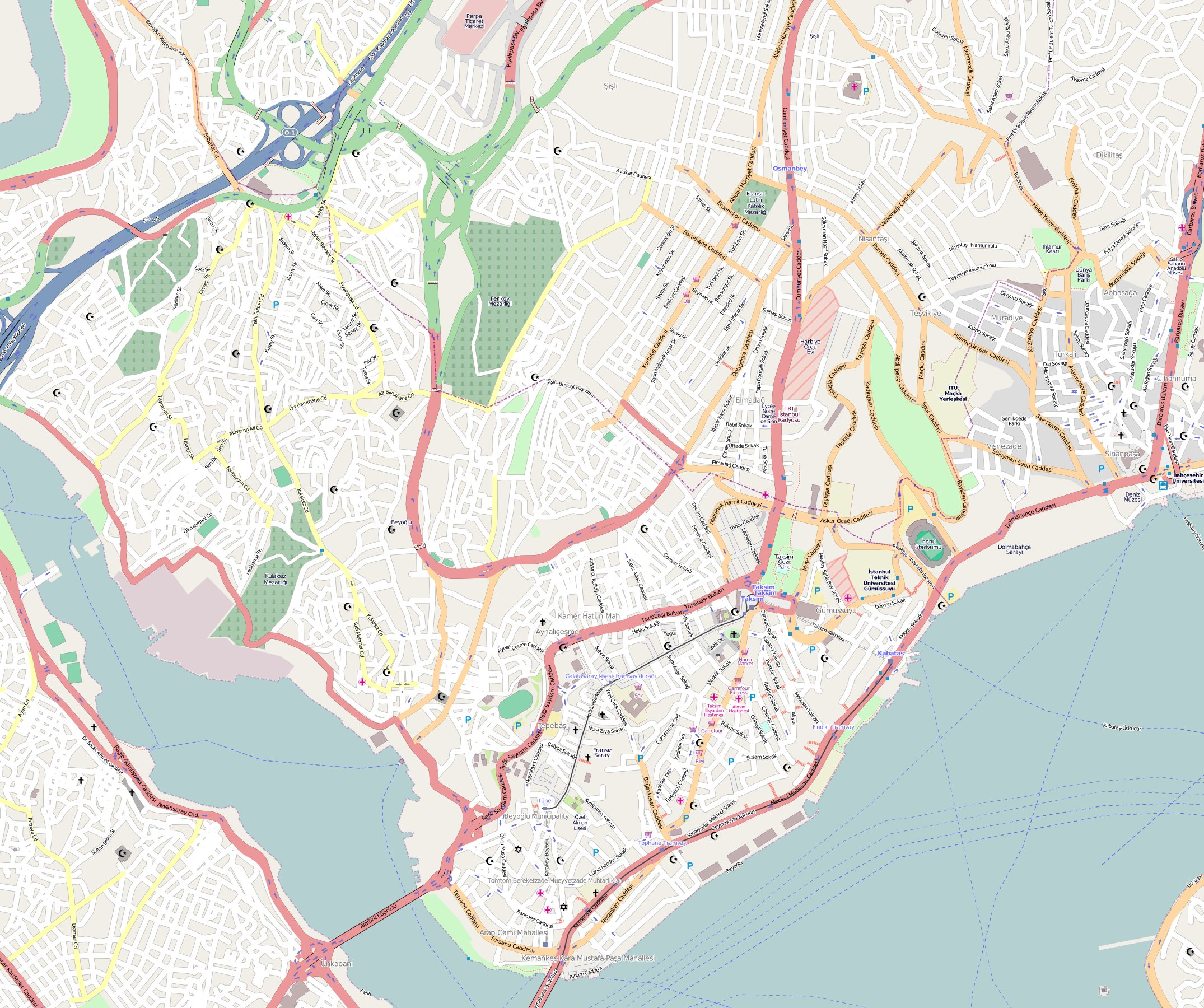
- Location within the Beyoğlu district of Istanbul

Religion
- Affiliation: Islam

Location
- Location: Istanbul, Turkey
- Coordinates: 41.0466°N 28.966°E

Architecture
- Architect: Mimar Sinan
- Type: mosque
- Style: Ottoman
- Groundbreaking: 1565
- Completed: 1573

Specifications
- Length: 30.5 metres (100 feet) (prayer hall)
- Width: 19.5 metres (64 feet)
- Dome: 6
- Dome height (outer): 22.2 metres (73 feet)
- Dome dia. (inner): 9.1 metres (30 feet)
- Minaret: 1

The Piyale Pasha Mosque (Ottoman Turkish: پیاله پاشا جامع Piyale Paşa Camii), also known as the Tersane Mosque (literally: Shipyard Mosque), is a 16th-century Ottoman mosque located in the Kasımpaşa neighborhood of the Beyoğlu district in Istanbul, Turkey.

== History ==
The Piyale Pasha Mosque was designed by Ottoman imperial architect Mimar Sinan for the vizier and grand admiral Piyale Mehmed Pasha. The mosque was built between 1565 and 1573.

== Architecture ==
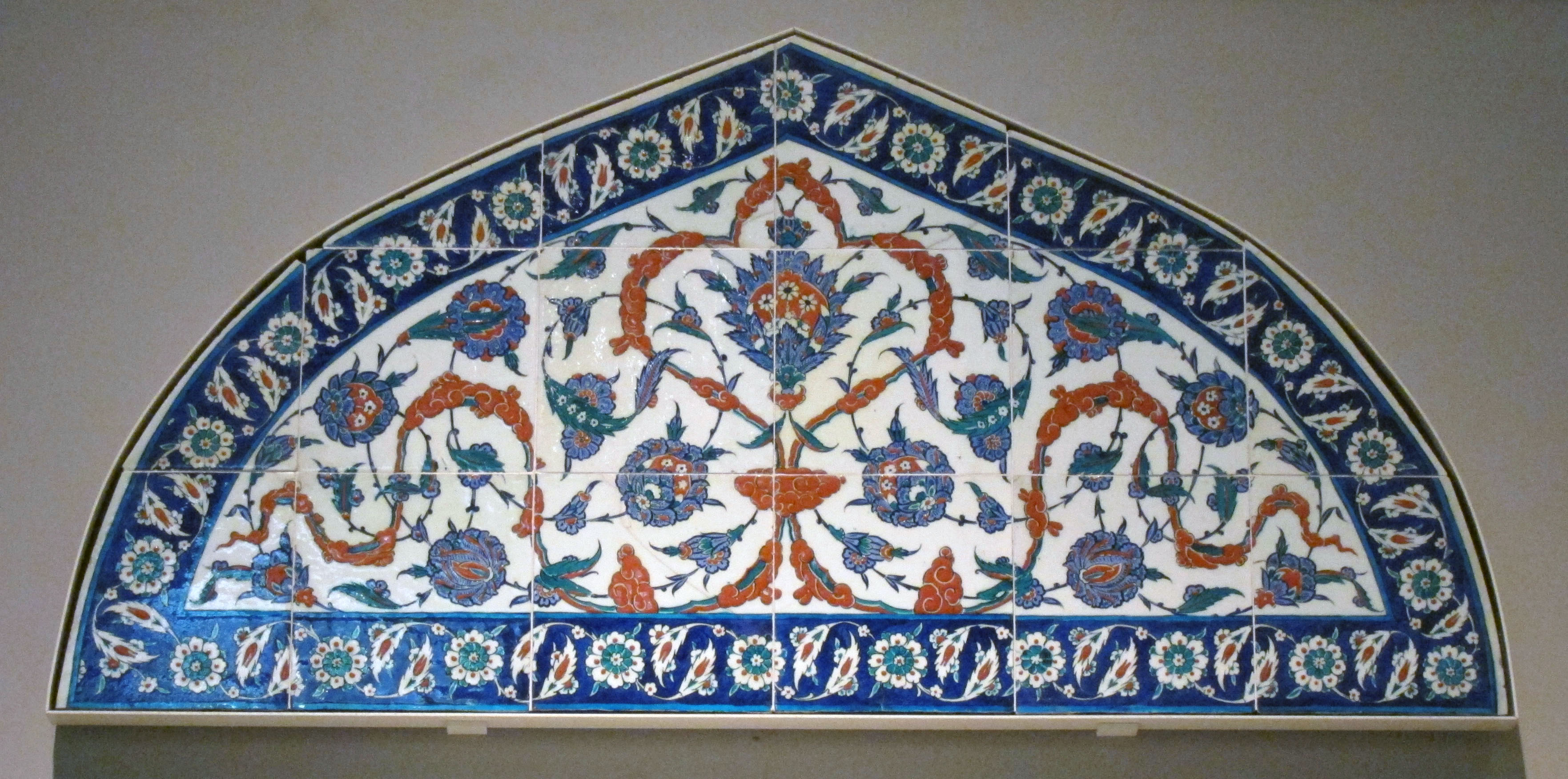
A lunette panel with Iznik tiles that may have come from the mosque

Unlike other mosques designed by Sinan that have a large central dome, the Piyale Pasha Mosque is constructed with six identical domes, arranged as two rows of three, each with a diameter of about 9 m (30 ft). It is one of only two mosques in Istanbul with multiple domes, the other being Vasat Atik Ali Pasha Mosque. The domes are supported in the center of the prayer hall by a pair of slender granite pillars. The minaret is placed in the centre of the anti-qibla wall. It was rebuilt in the middle of the 19th century. Around three walls of the interior are a row of Iznik tiles with inscriptions in a white thuluth script on a cobalt-blue background. The interior walls are now whitewashed but they were originally decorated. The stained-glass in the windows of the qibla wall is not original.

The domed octagonal mausoleum to the northwest of the mosque contains the tomb of Piyale Pasha together with those of his sons and daughters. Altogether there are thirteen sarcophagi. His wife, Gevherhan Sultan (daughter of Selim II), remarried and is entombed in Selim II's mausoleum next to Hagia Sophia.

A number of identical Iznik tiled lunette panels that are now on display in the Musée du Louvre in Paris, the Museu Calouste Gulbenkian in Lisbon (Note: The Calouste Gulbenkian Museum owns a second panel that is not on display.) and the Victoria and Albert Museum in London may have been removed from the Piyale Pasha Mosque in the 19th century. The panels would have been placed above the lower row of windows. Another possibility is that the lunette tiles came from a now demolished kiosk that was associated with the mosque. Two tiles from another lunette panel and a pair of tiles that probably came from the mihrab were sold at auction by Christie's in 2004.

== Gallery ==
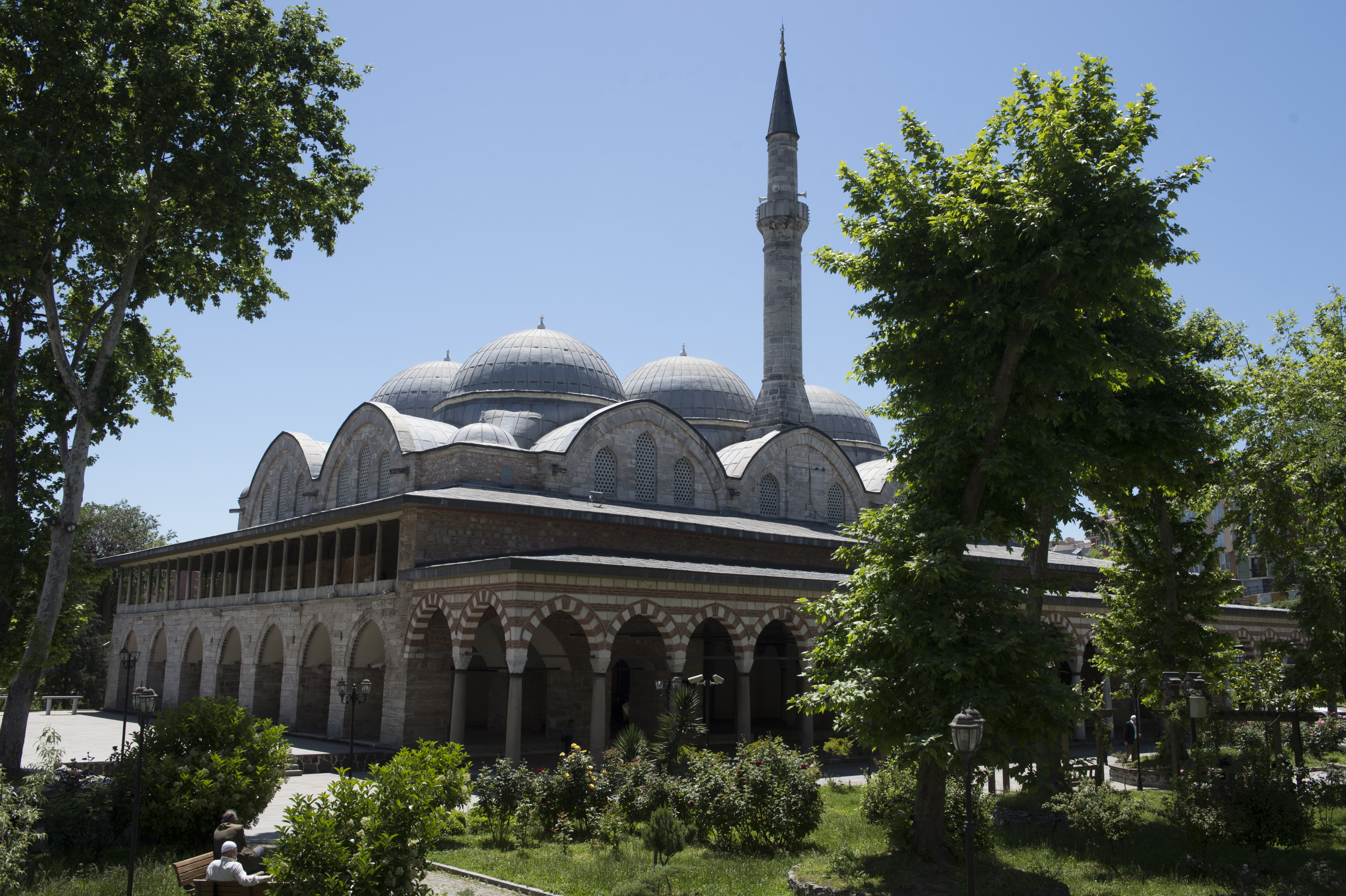
Piyale Pasha Mosque exterior

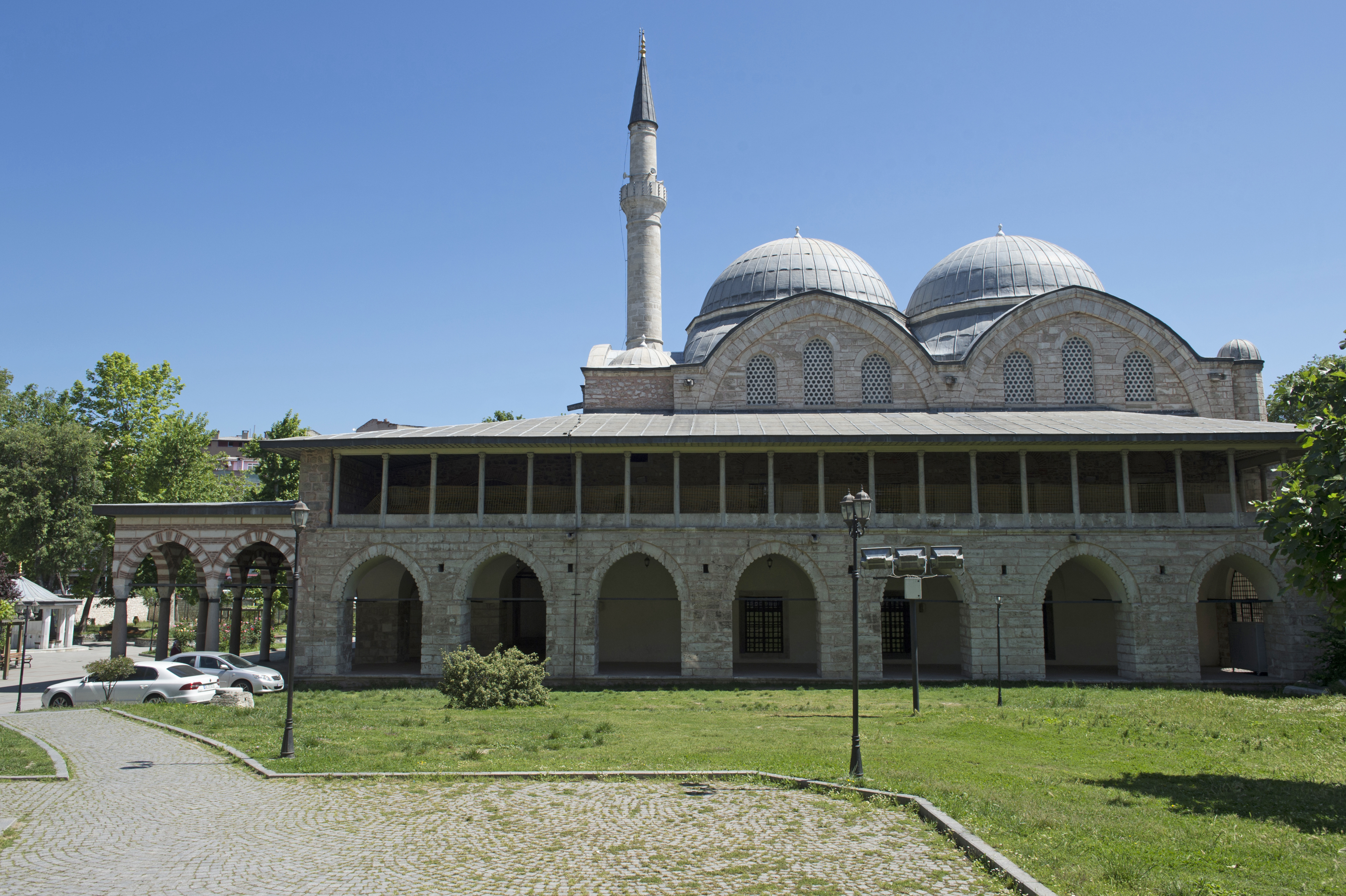
Piyale Pasha Mosque exterior

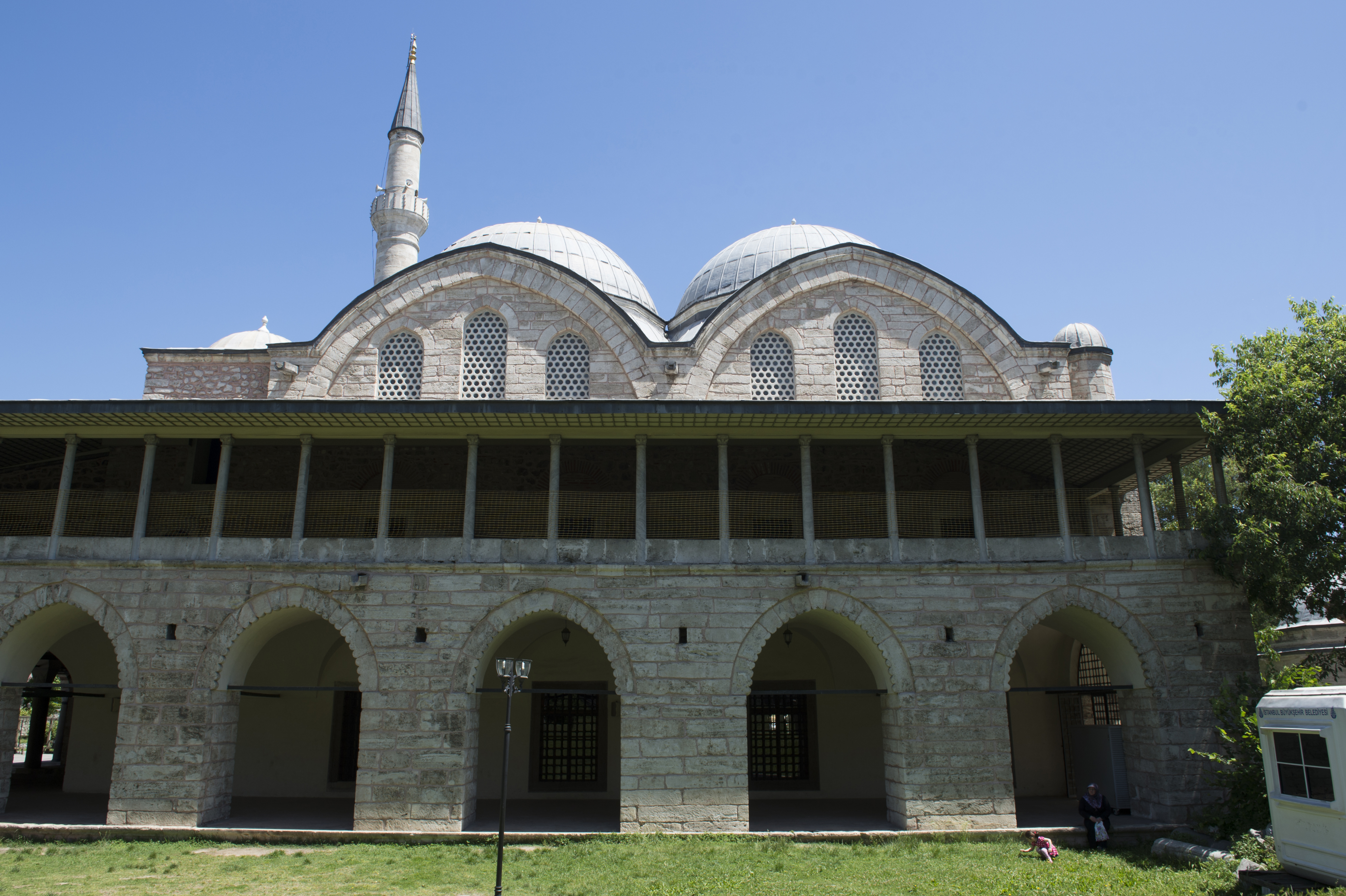
Piyale Pasha Mosque exterior

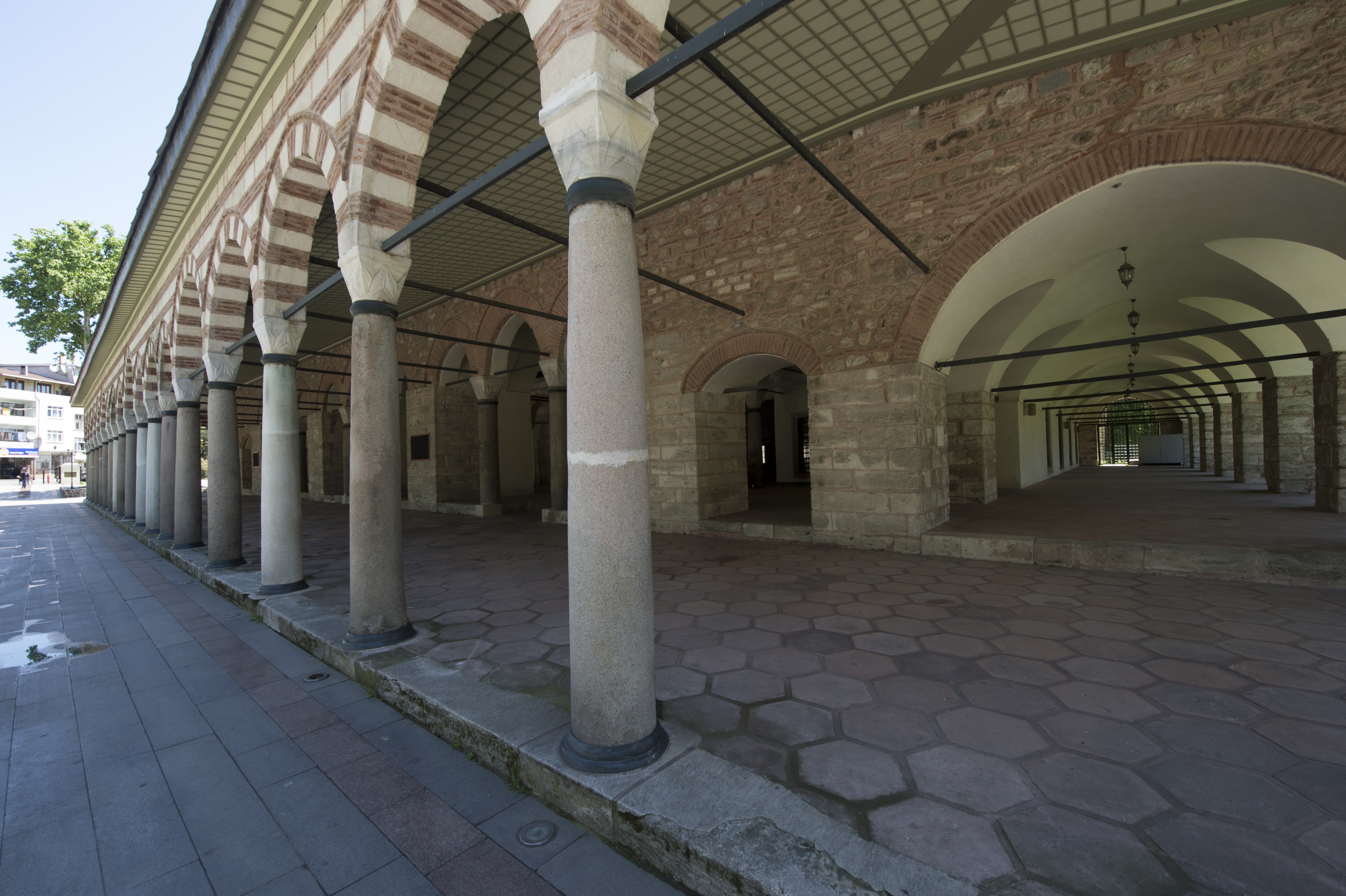
Piyale Pasha Mosque galleries

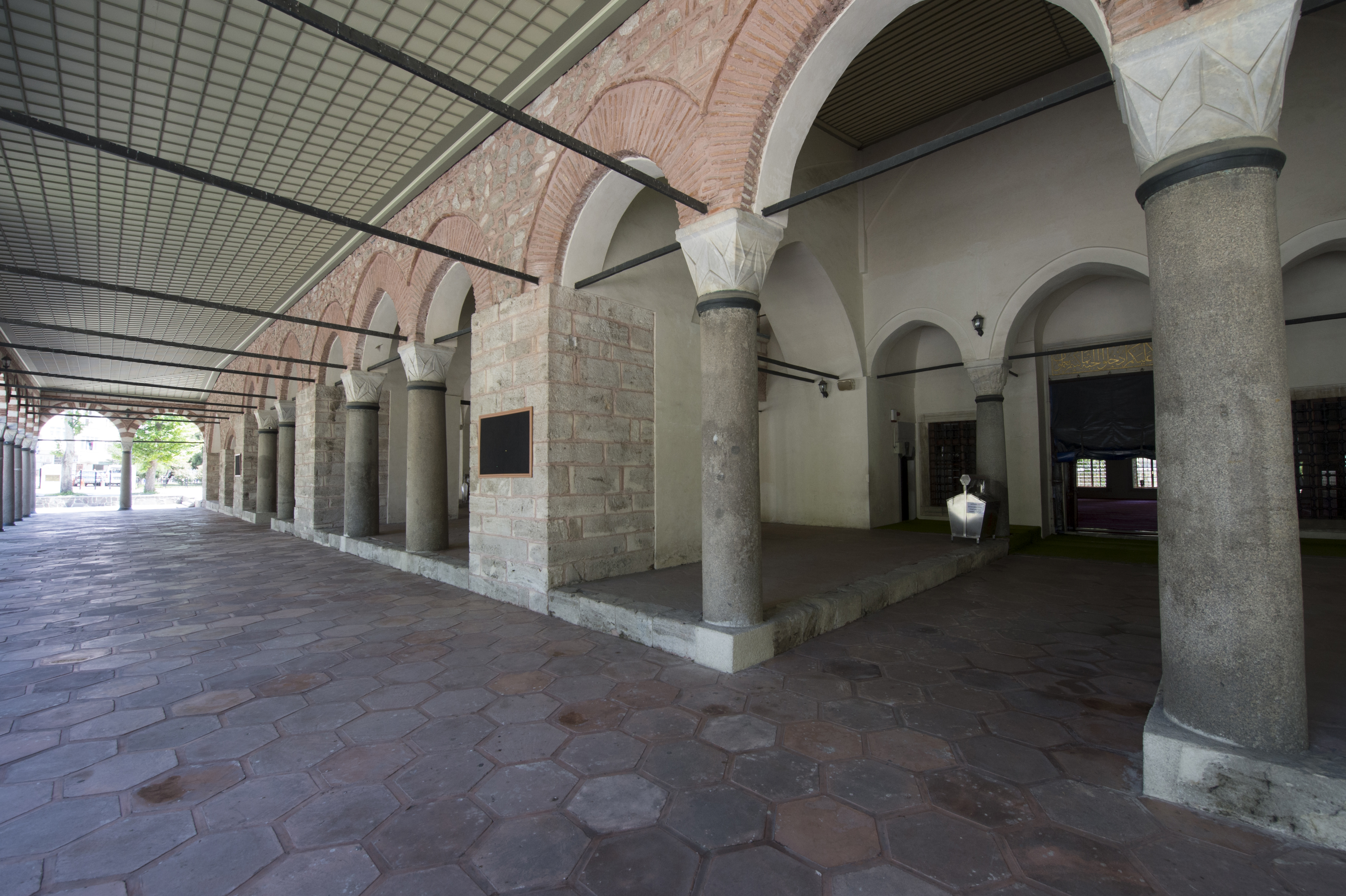
Piyale Pasha Mosque galleries

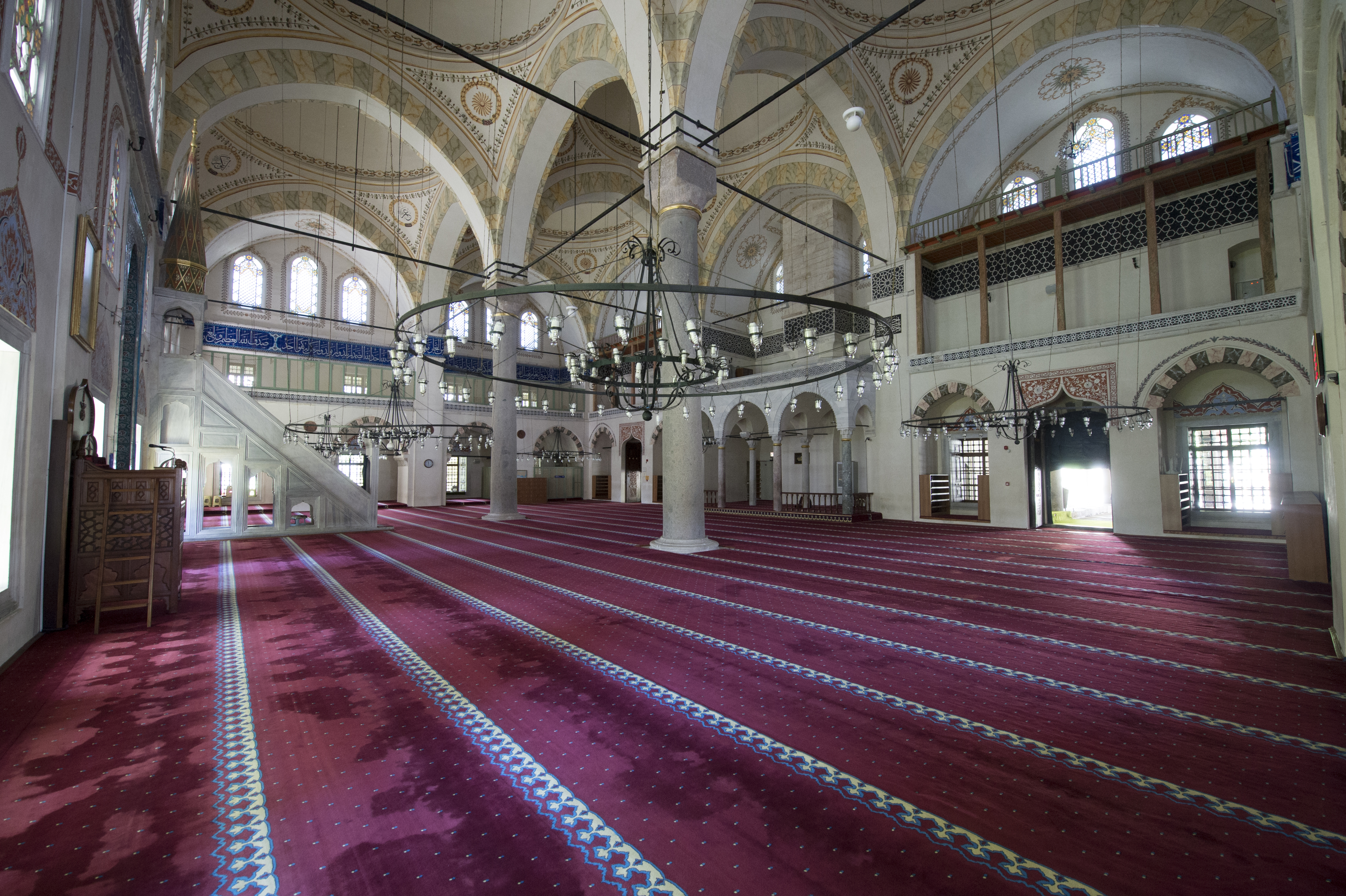
Piyale Pasha Mosque general view

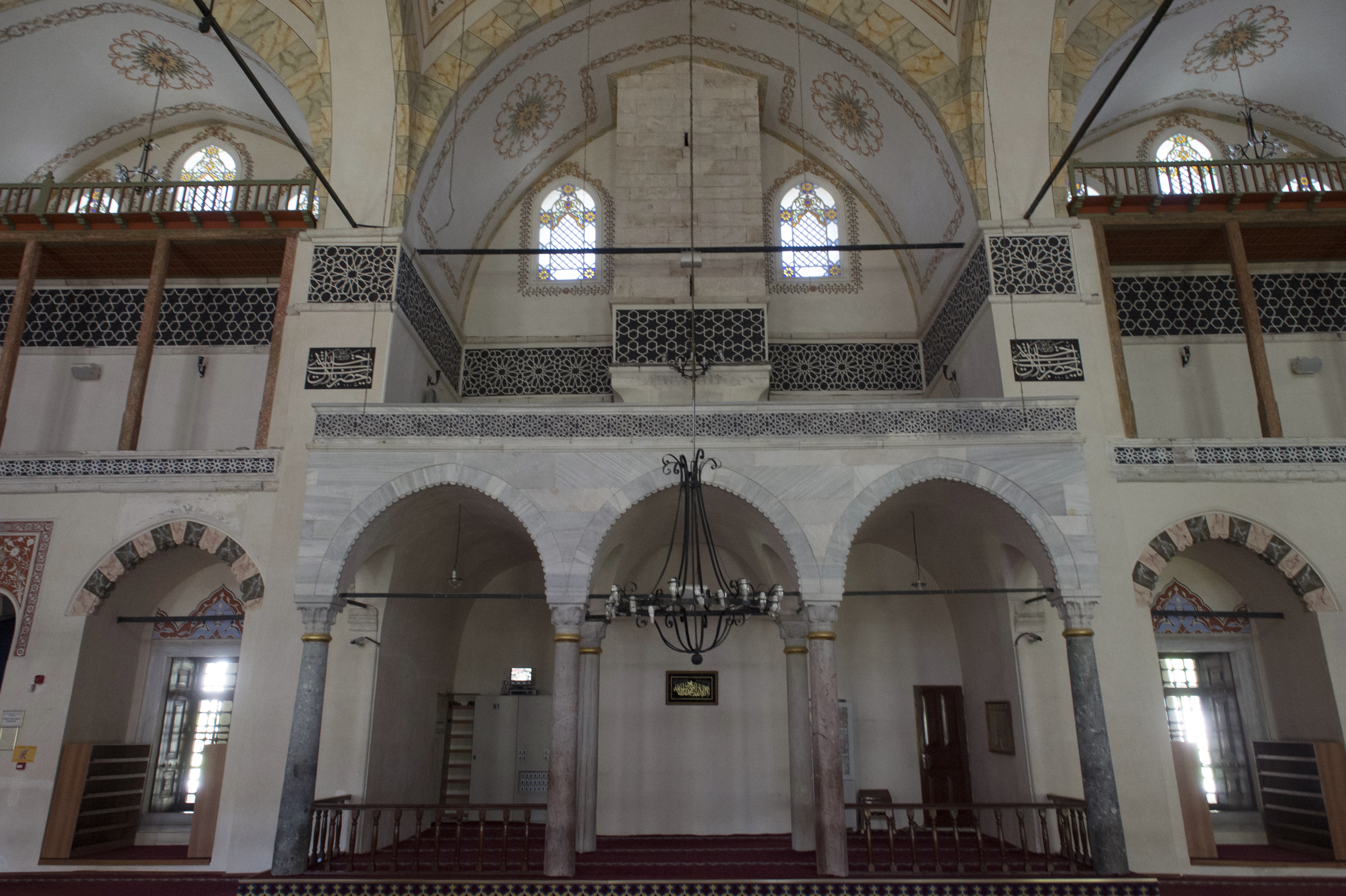
Piyale Pasha Mosque view towards muezzin's platform

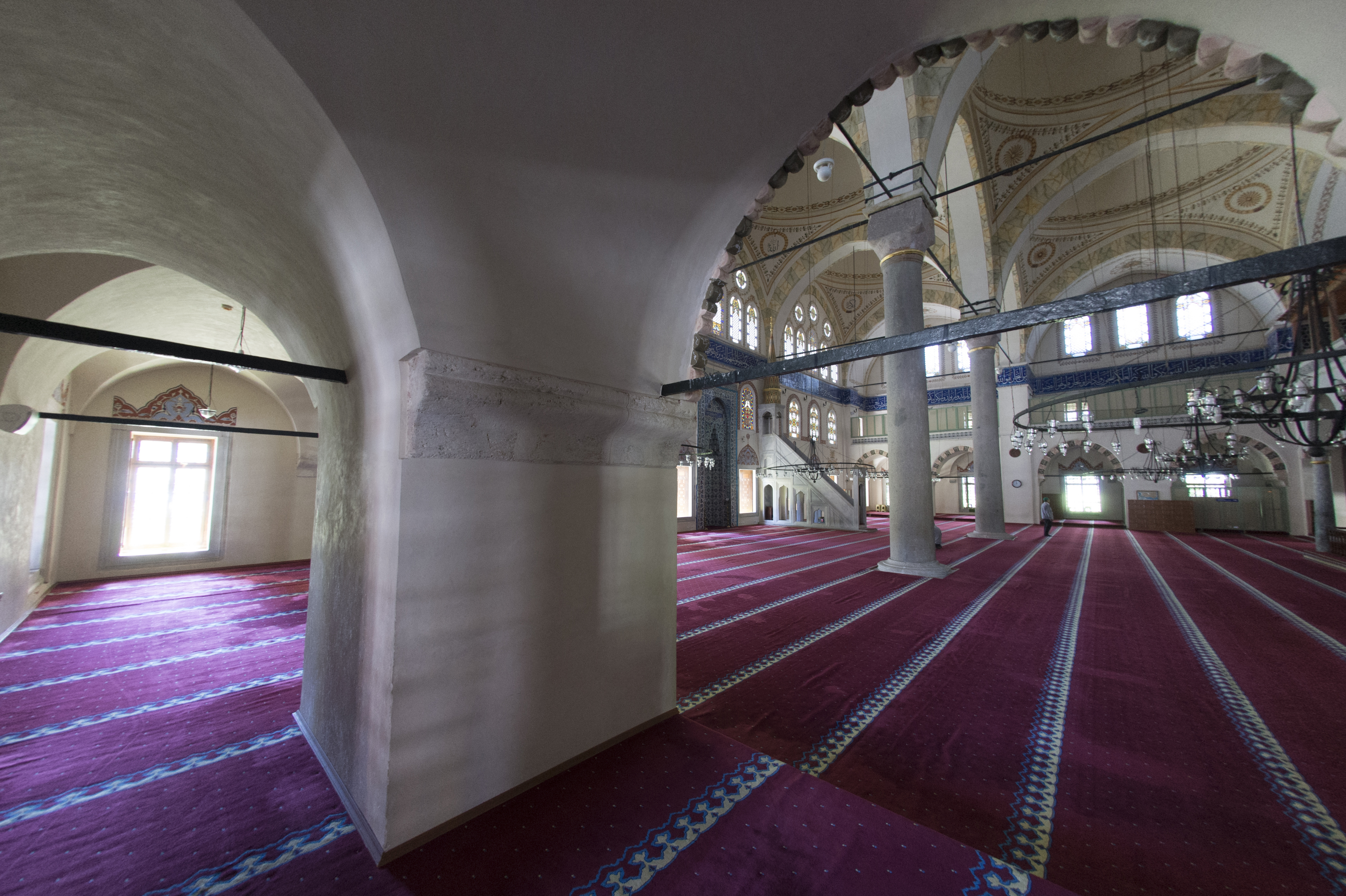
Piyale Pasha Mosque interior view from side

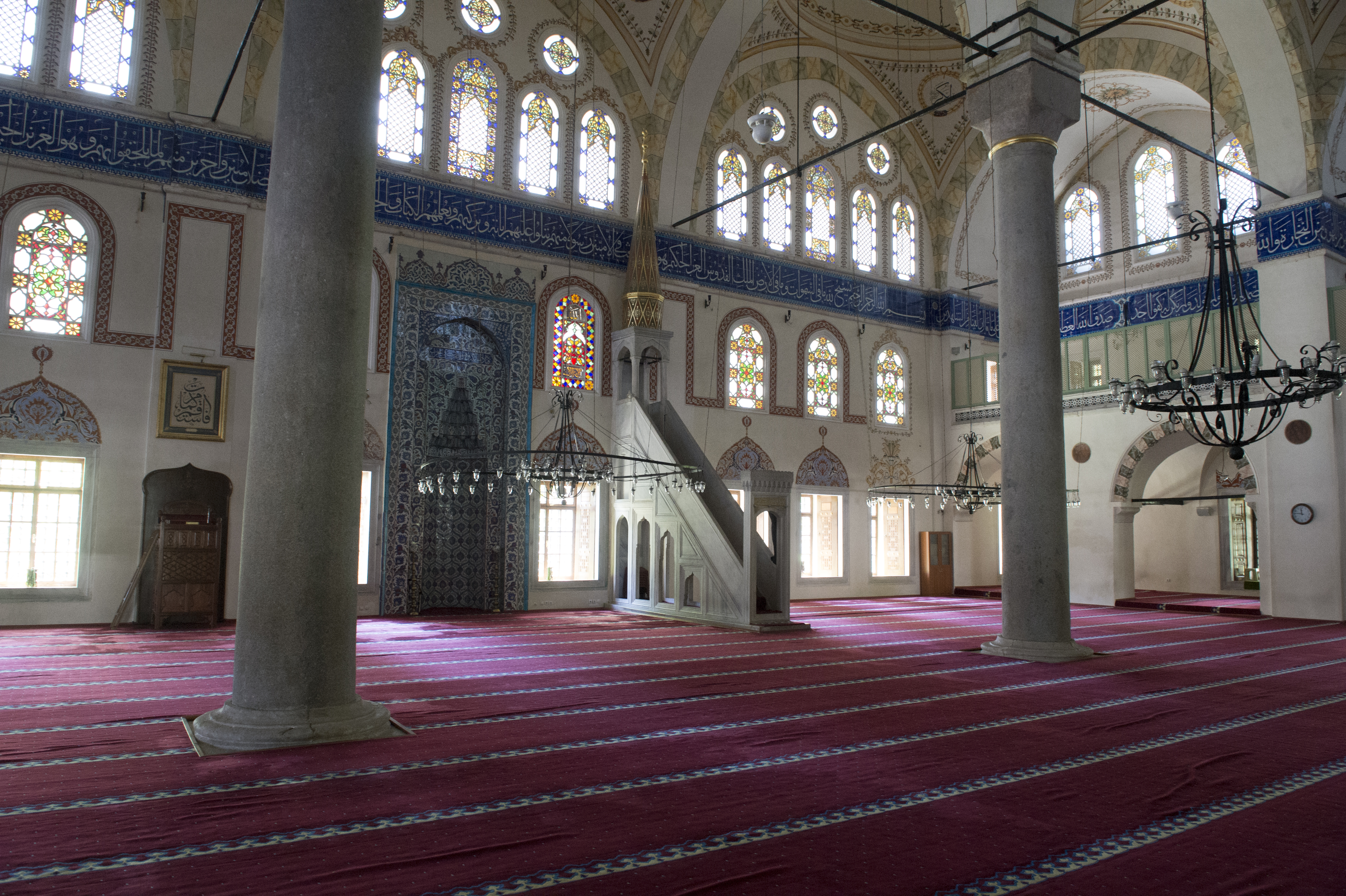
Piyale Pasha Mosque view towards mihhrab

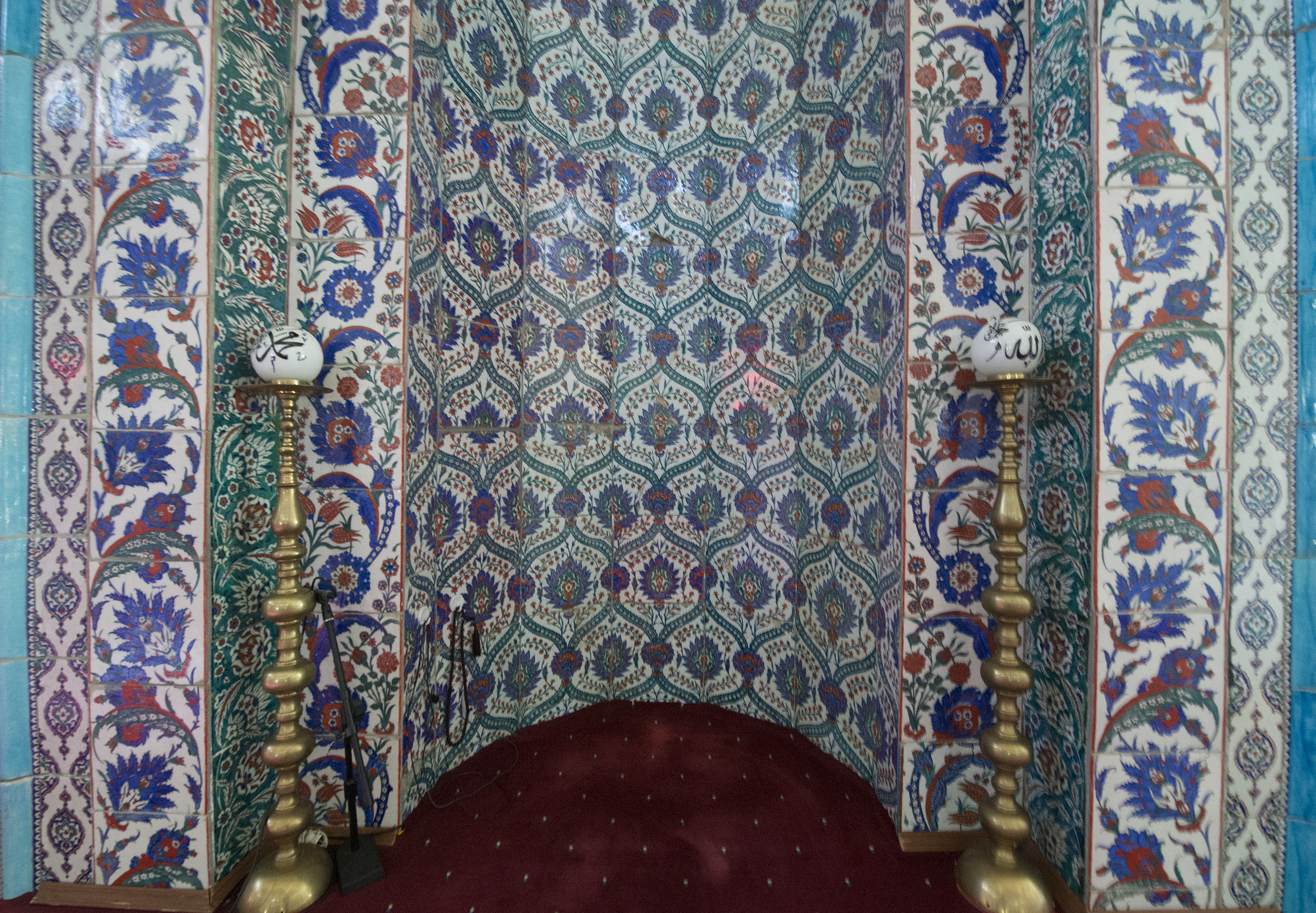
Piyale Pasha Mosque mihrab detail

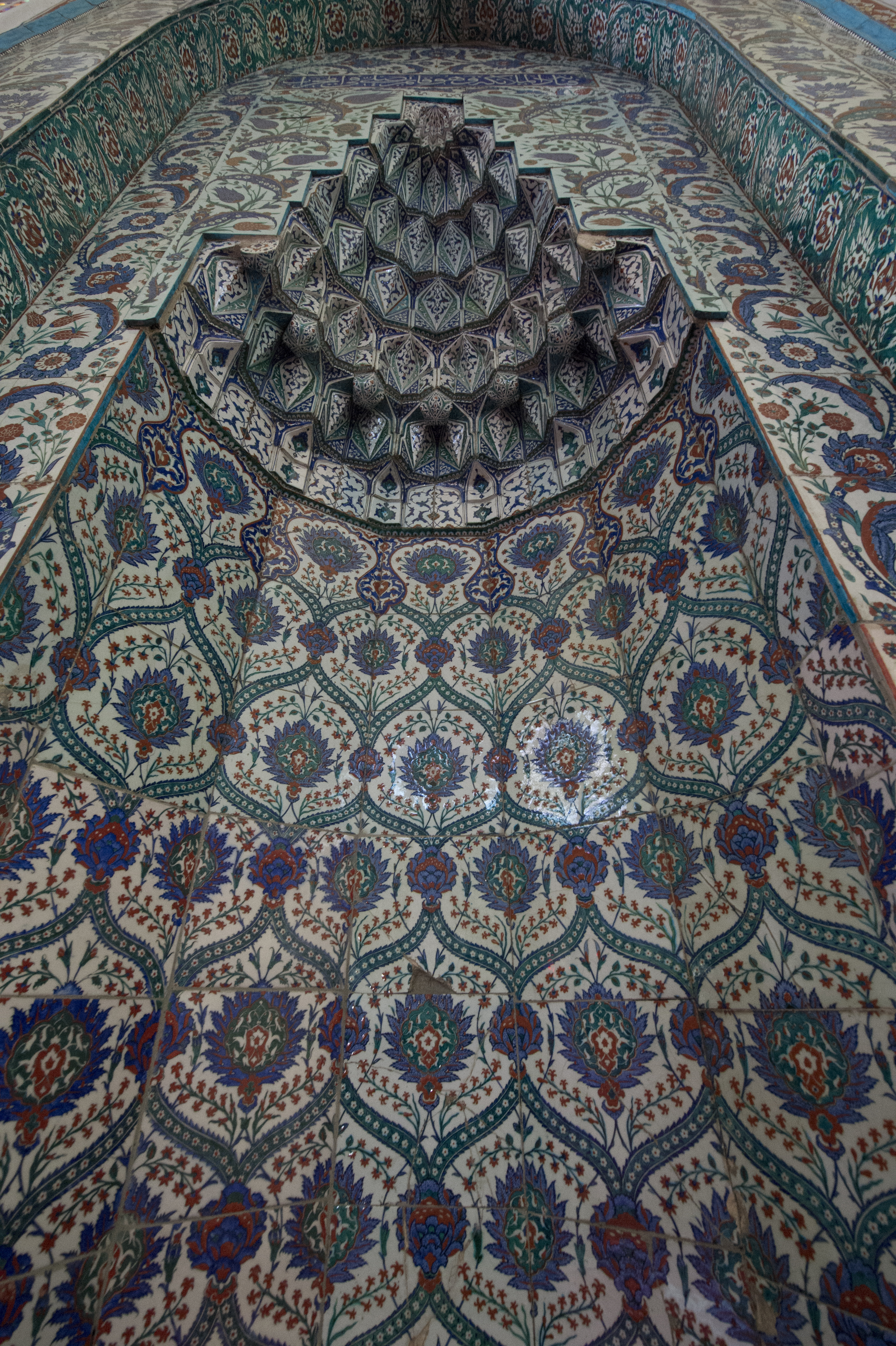
Piyale Pasha Mosque mihrab detail

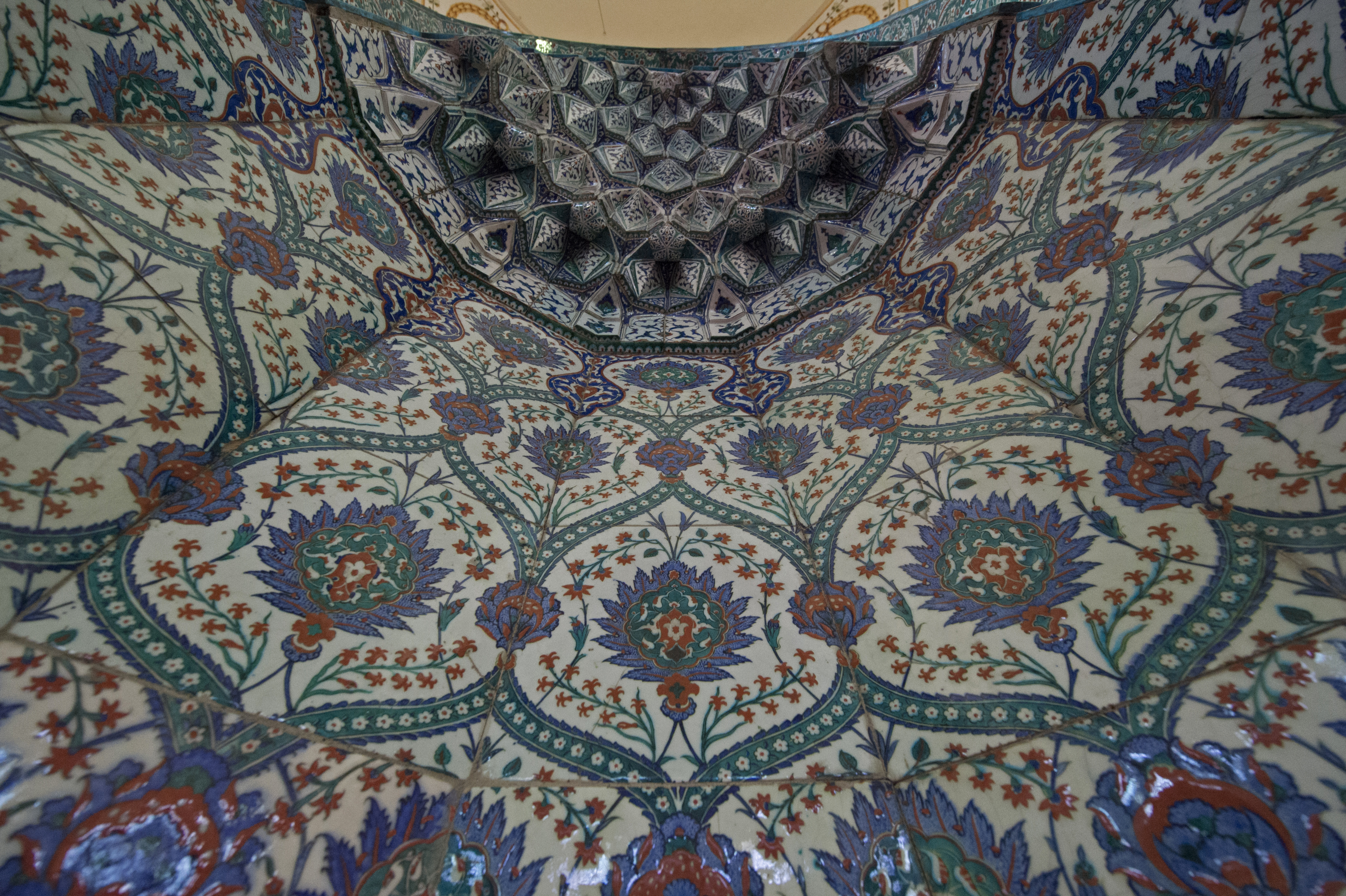
Piyale Pasha Mosque mihrab detail

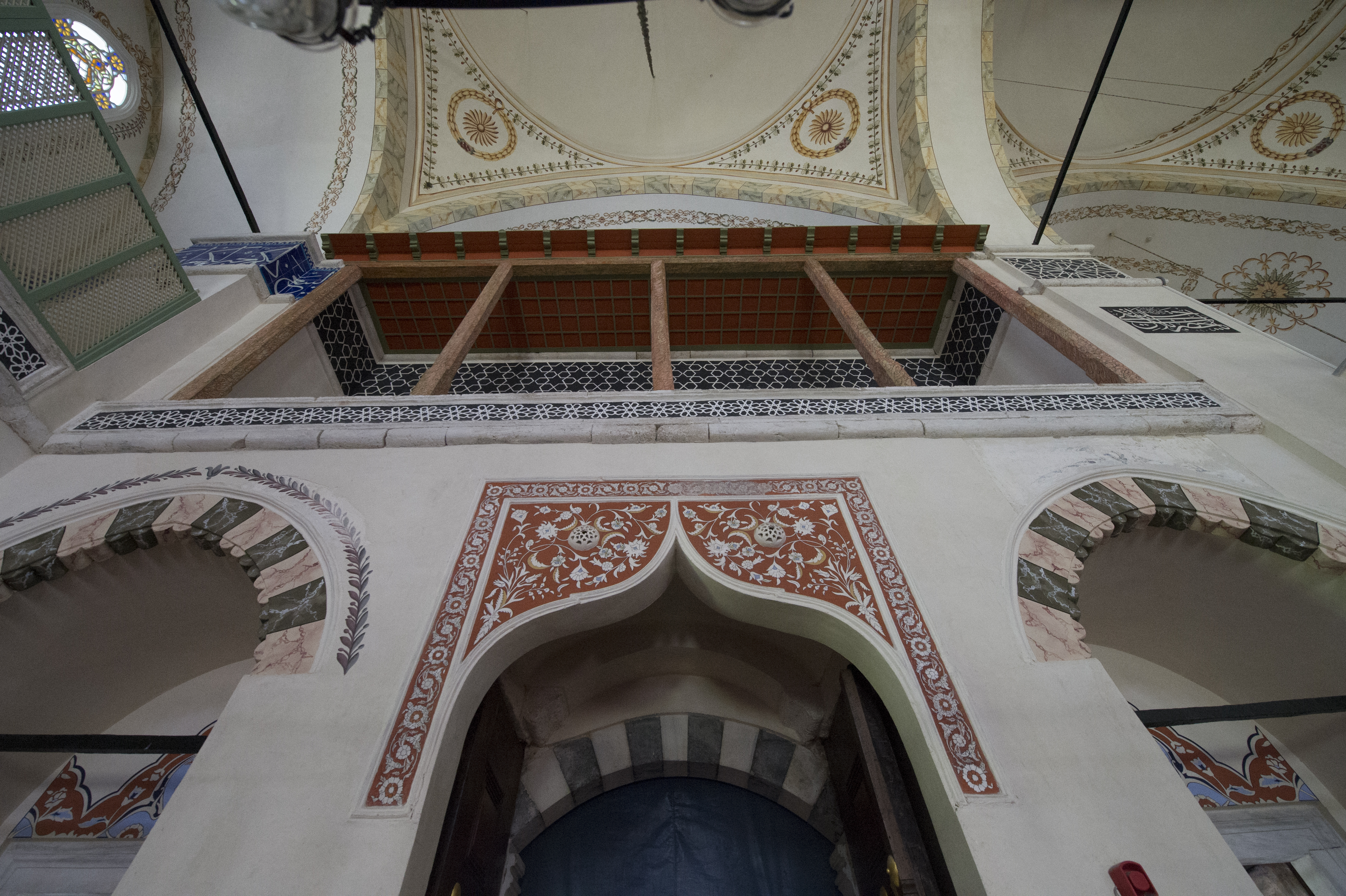
Piyale Pasha Mosque mihrab detail

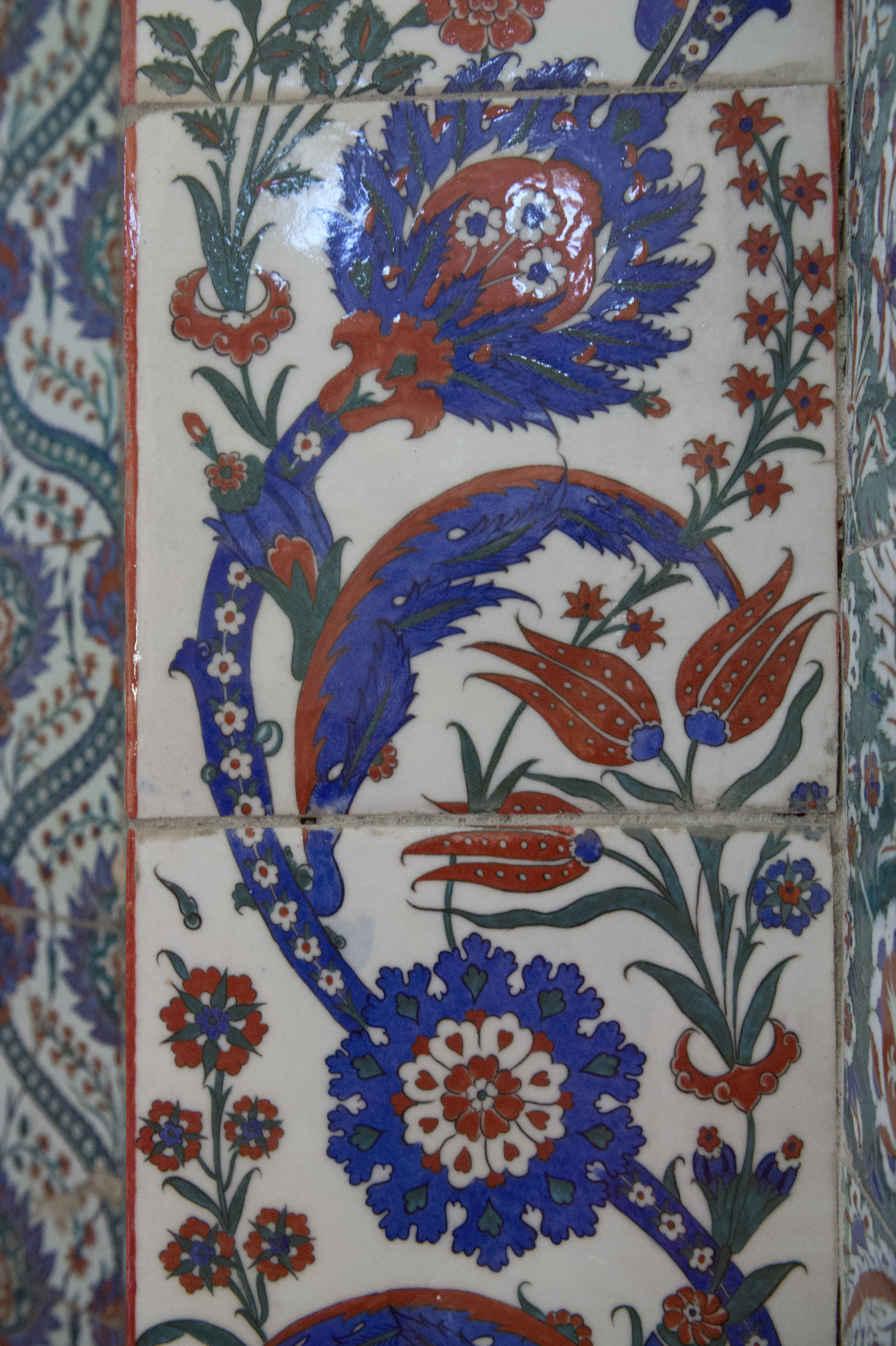
Piyale Pasha Mosque mihrab detail

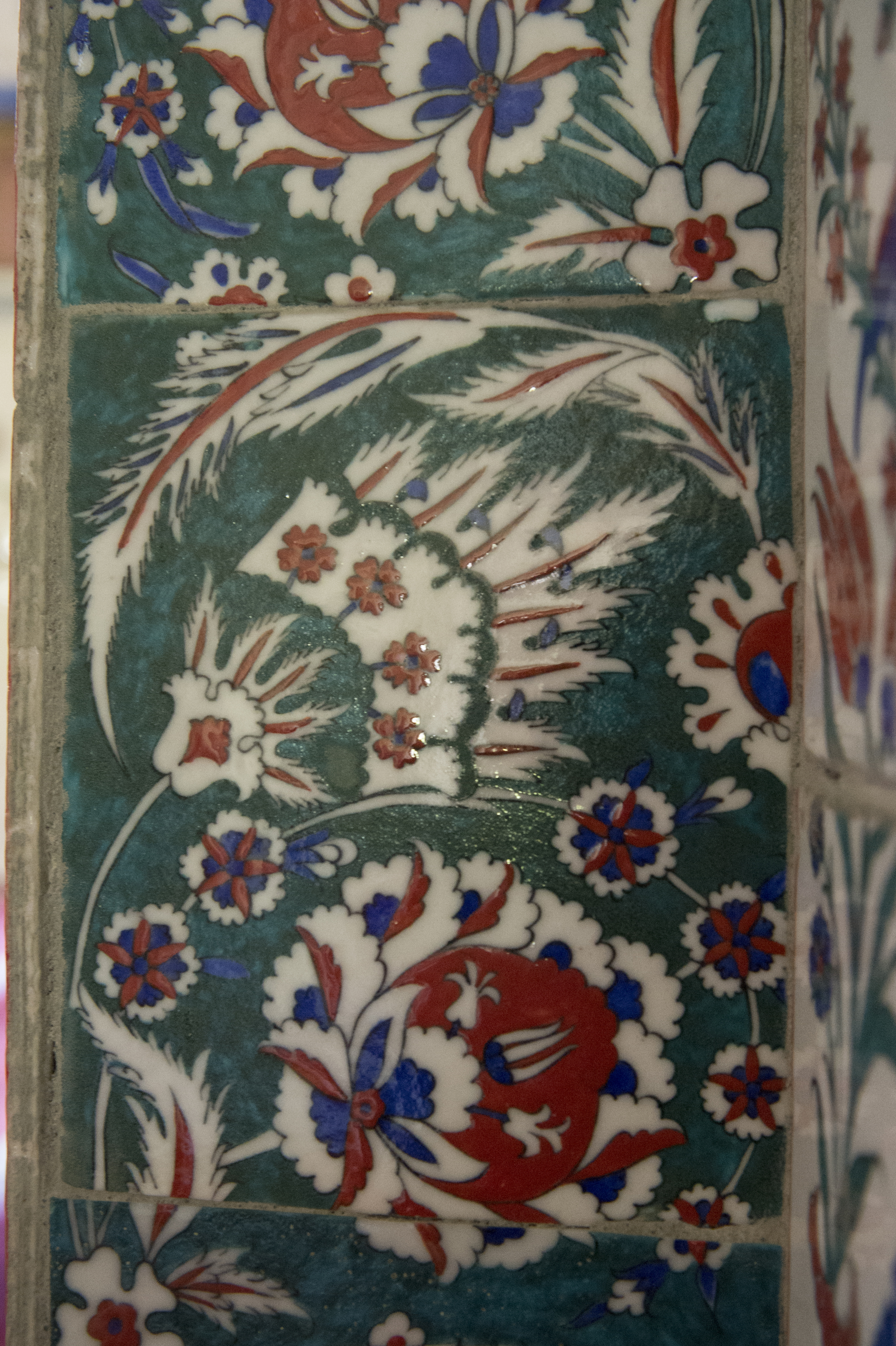
Piyale Pasha Mosque mihrab detail

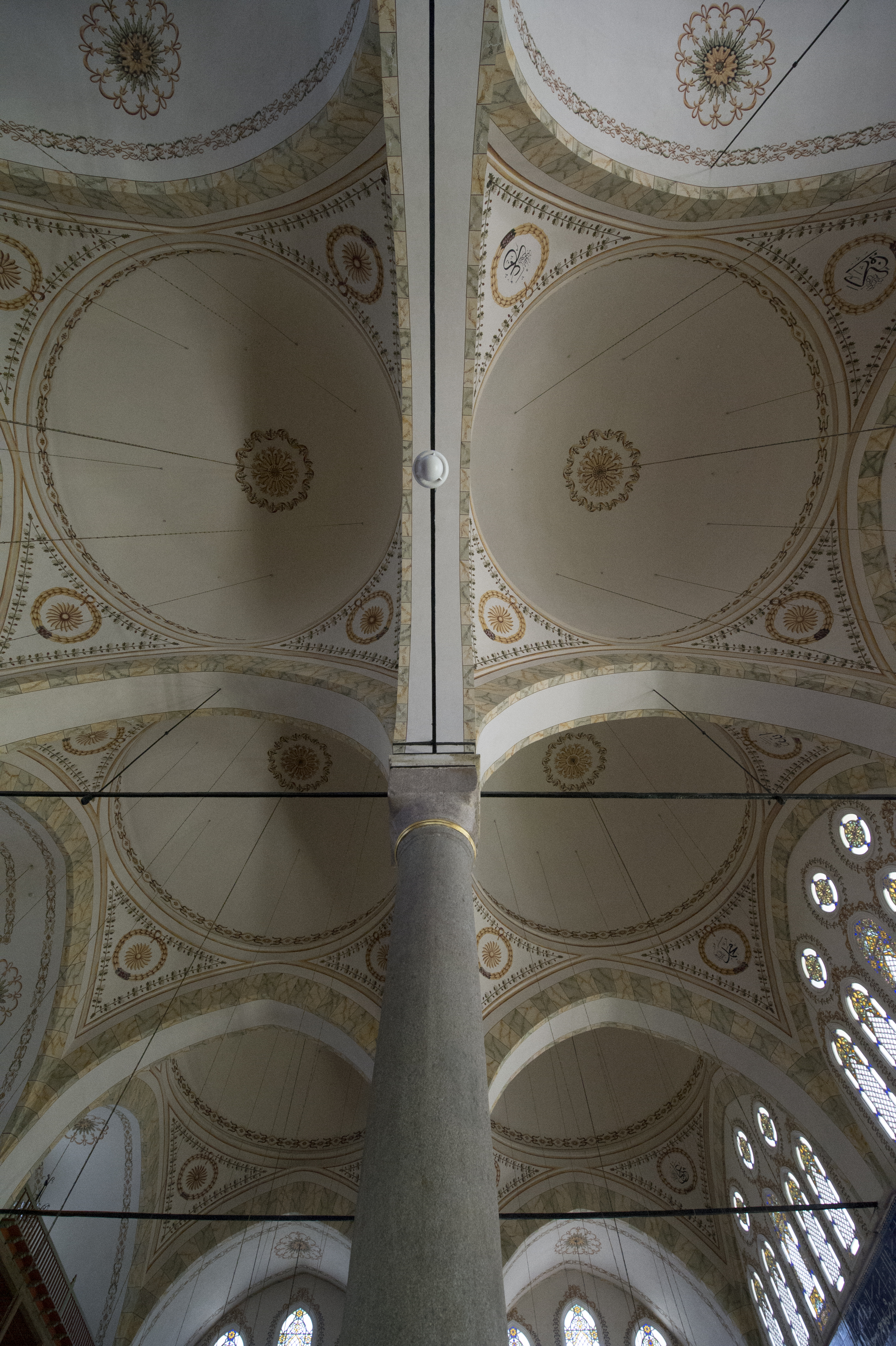
Piyale Pasha Mosque domes from inside

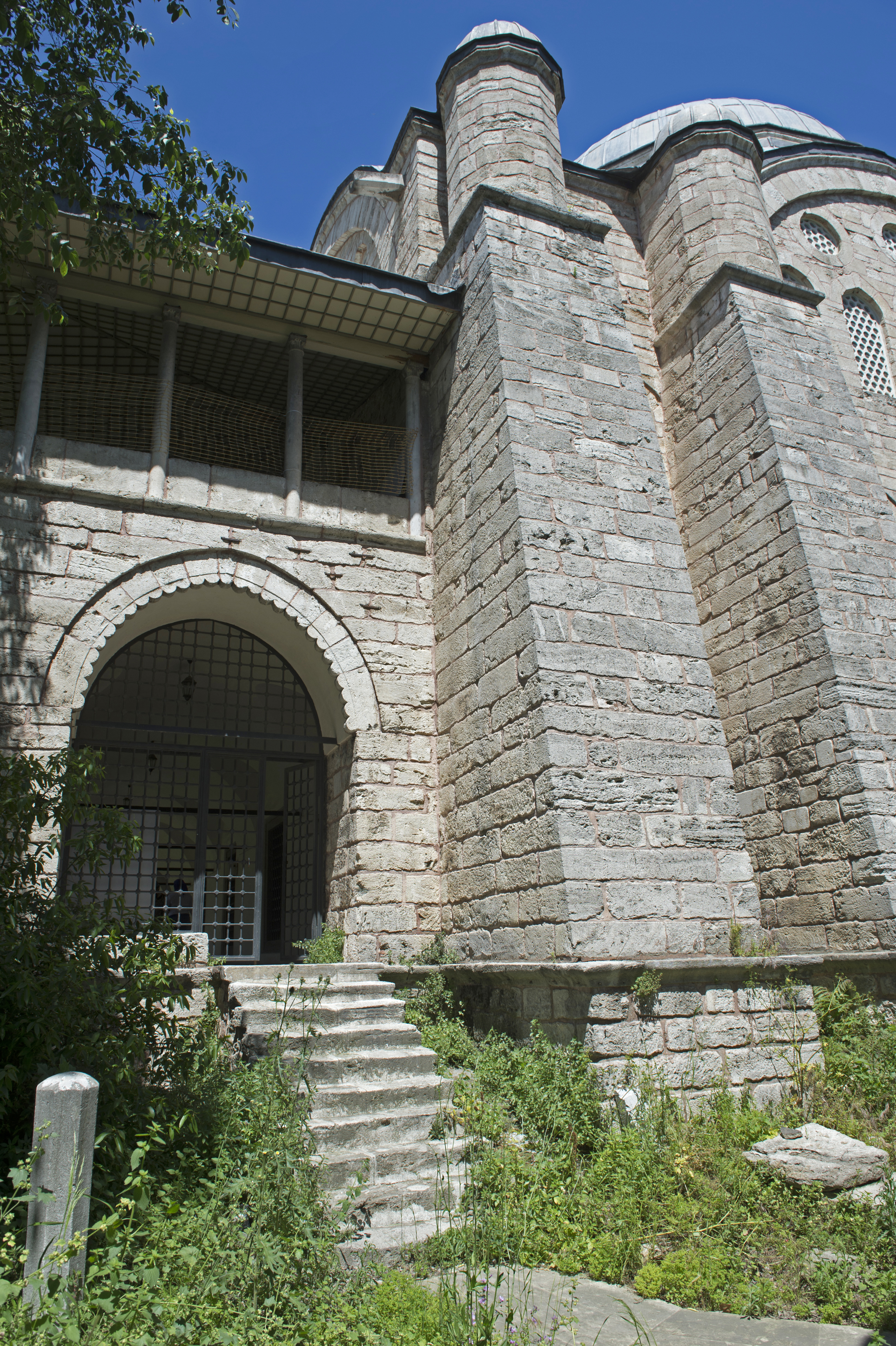
Piyale Pasha Mosque entrance to garden

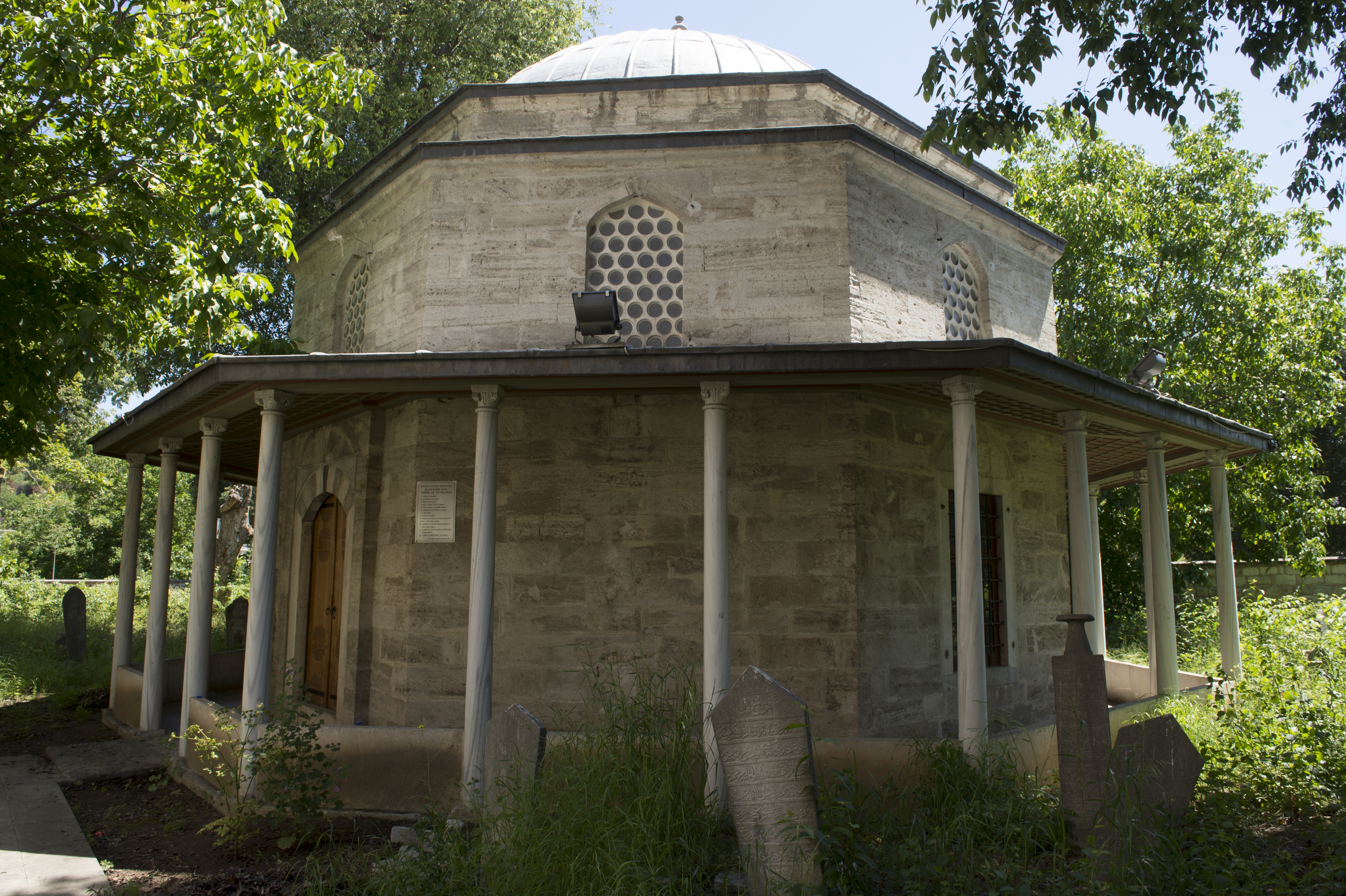
Piyale Pasha Mosque founder's tomb

== See also ==
- List of Friday mosques designed by Mimar Sinan

== Sources ==
- Denny, Walter B. (2004). Iznik: the artistry of Ottoman ceramics. London: Thames & Hudson. ISBN 978-0-500-51192-3.
- Denny, Walter B. (2005). "Dispersed Ottoman unified-field tile panels" (PDF). Benaki Museum Journal. 4, 2004: 149–157. ISSN 2407-9502.
- Necipoğlu, Gülru (2005). The Age of Sinan: Architectural Culture in the Ottoman Empire. London: Reaktion Books. ISBN 978-1-86189-253-9.
- Queiroz Ribeiro, Maria (2009). Iznik pottery and tiles in the Calouste Gulbenkian collection. Lisbon: Calouste Gulbenkian Foundation. ISBN 978-972-8848-58-3.
