= Sedefkar Mehmed Agha =

Ottoman architect

- Born: c. 1540 probably Elbasan or Kalkandelen (Tetovo), Ottoman Empire
- Died: 1617 (aged 76 or 77); Istanbul, Ottoman Empire
- Citizenship: Ottoman
- Occupation: Architect
- Buildings: Sultan Ahmed Mosque

Sedefkar Mehmed Agha (Modern Turkish: Sedefkâr Mehmed Ağa, Albanian: Sedefqar Mehmet Aga Elbasani; about 1540–1617) was an Ottoman architect, notably the builder of Sultan Ahmed Mosque (the "Blue Mosque") in Istanbul.

== Biography ==
Sedefkar Mehmed was Albanian. His birthplace and birthdate are uncertain, but he is thought to have been born in the area of Elbasan or in Kalkandelen (modern Tetovo). In Elbasan, forty fountains were built by him.

He was brought to Istanbul in 1563 as a "Devshirme" to join the janissary corps or palace schools. After six years as a cadet (acemioğlan) he began the study of music. During a period of twenty years he specialized with inlay in mother-of-pearl, giving him the surname Sedefkâr (worker in mother-of-pearl). Later he also switched to architecture. He became a pupil of architect Mimar Sinan, Turkey's most celebrated architect, becoming his first assistant in charge of the office in the absence of Sinan.

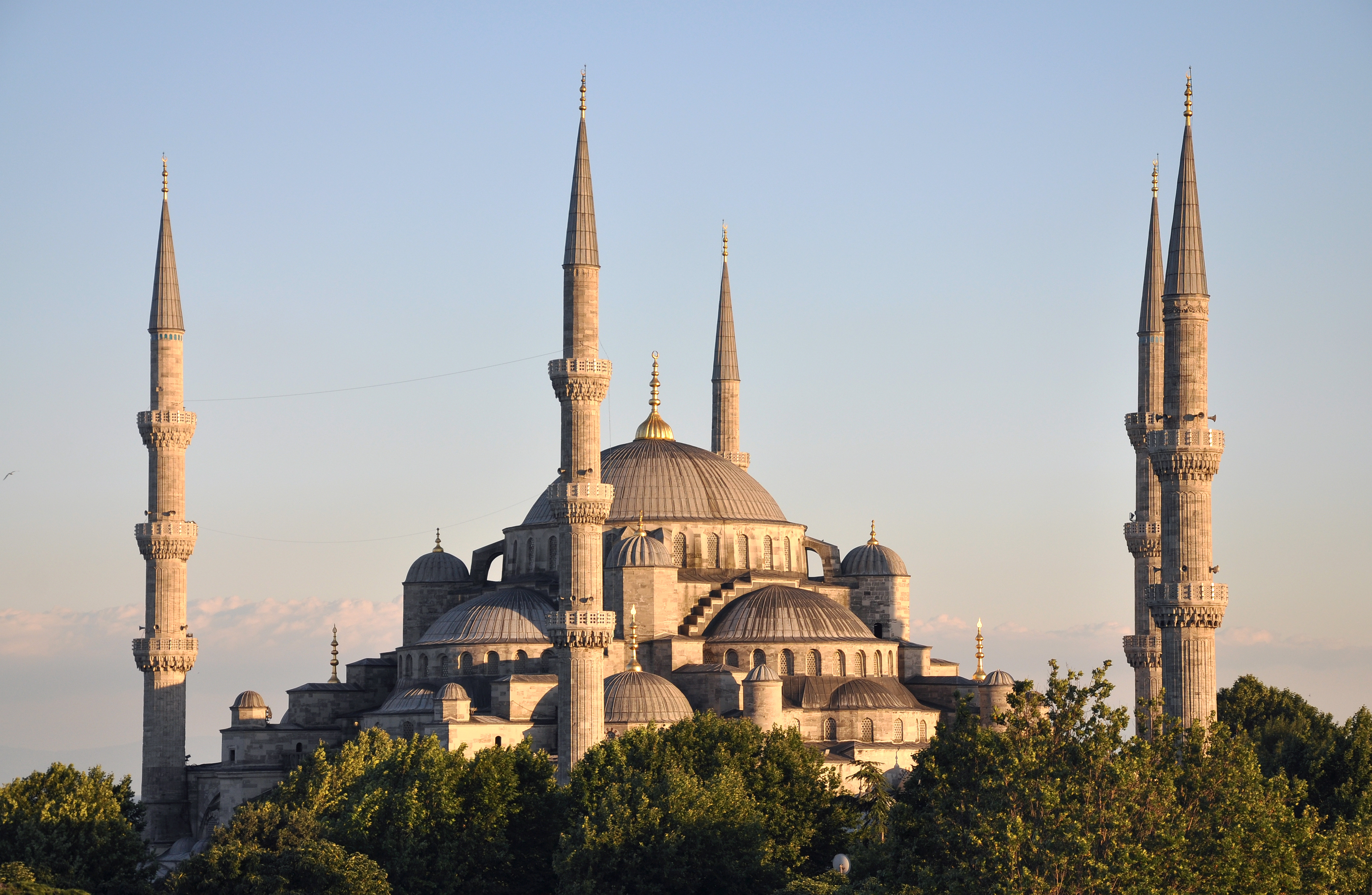
The Sultan Ahmed Mosque in Istanbul is considered the culmination of the career of Sedefkâr Mehmed Ağa.

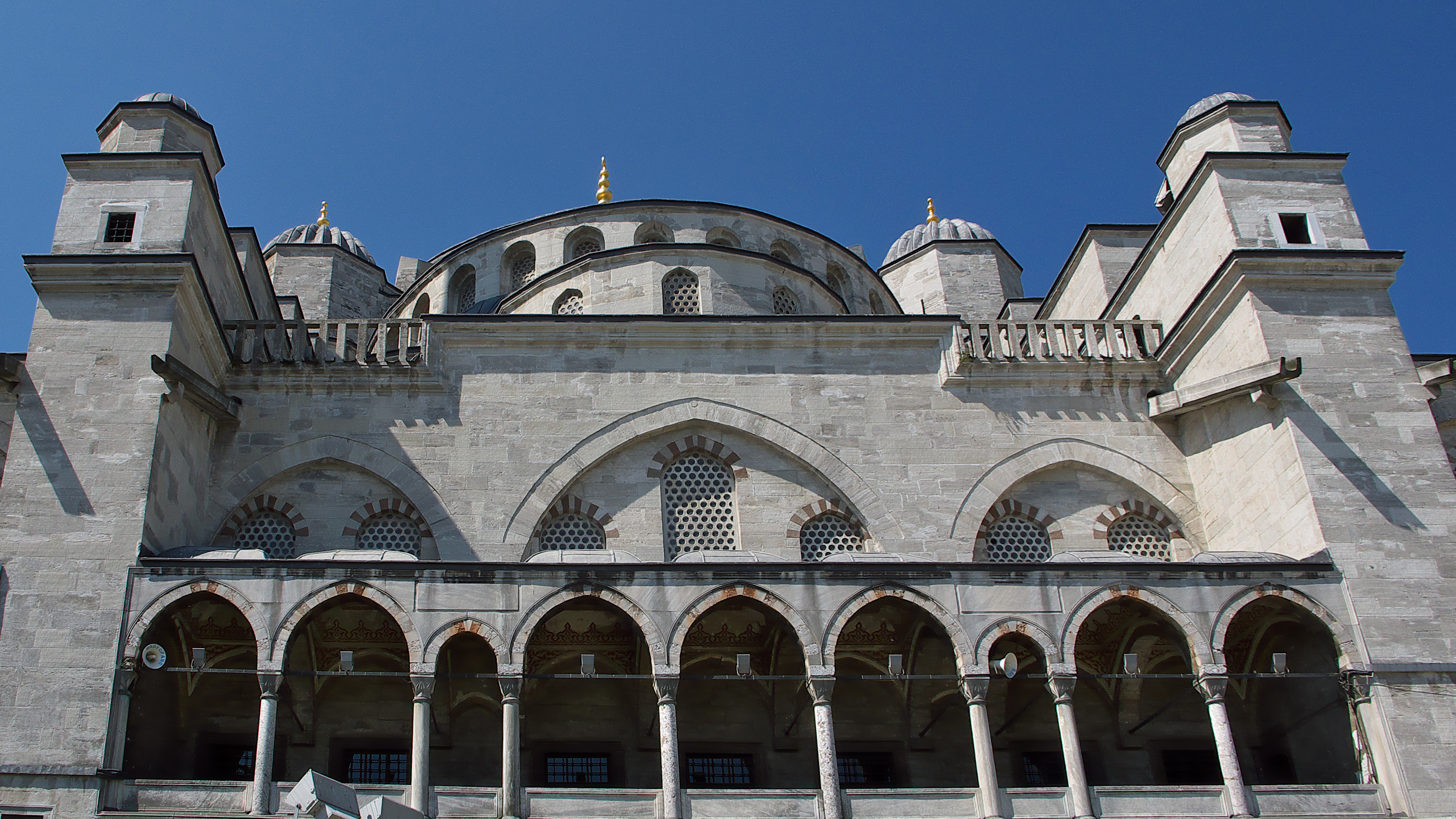
Sultan Ahmed Mosque, northeast façade

In January 1586 he was appointed to complete the Muradiye Mosque in Manisa, a construction started by his master Sinan. He gave a Koran box to sultan Murat III (possibly on the advice of Sinan) and was appointed Gate Keeper (Kapıcı). When Sinan died in 1588, Mehmed Agha, his first assistant was not appointed as his successor, but instead the Grand Vizier appointed Davut Ağa, the Master of the Waterways, as the royal architect.

When in 1591 Mehmed Agha gave the sultan a richly decorated quiver, he was promoted to Chief Bailiff (muhzirbaṣı). In the same year he even became lieutenant-governor (mütesellin) of Diyarbakır and Inspector of Works. During the following years he visited Arabia, Egypt and Macedonia. In 1597 he was appointed Master of the Waterways by sultan Mehmed III. He was also given the commission for the building of a walnut throne, inlaid with nacre and tortoise shell, for Ahmed I, which can be seen in the Topkapı Palace.

After Davut's execution in 1599, he was succeeded as royal architect by Dalgıç Ahmet Ağa. In 1606 Mehmed Agha was finally named chief imperial architect to the Ottoman court, succeeding Dalgıç Ahmet Ağa, builder of the large tomb of Mehmed III in the garden of Hagia Sophia.

From 1609 until 1616 he worked exclusively on the Sultan Ahmed Mosque, called the Blue Mosque because of the colour of its tile work. The design of the mosque was based on the Hagia Sophia (Church of Holy Wisdom), the masterpiece of Byzantine architecture built in the 6th century, and on the work of his master, Mimar Sinan. The design of the mosque is perfectly symmetrical, with a great central dome buttressed by four semi-domes and surrounded by a number of smaller exedrae.

Mehmed Agha had a book on architecture theory written for him by Cafer Efendi. In this book he explained his methods of work and the architectural training of the period.

Mehmed Agha died in 1617 in Istanbul at about the same time as his sultan.

== Legacy ==
By way of his works he left a decided mark on Istanbul. The square on which the Sultan Ahmed Mosque is situated became known as Sultanahmet. This mosque can be considered the culmination of his career. Mehmed Agha, who was the last student of Mimar Sinan, had completed his mission by adding his brighter, colorful architectural style to that of his master teacher.

== See also ==
- Ottoman architecture
- Byzantine architecture

== Bibliography ==
- Goodwin G., "A History of Ottoman Architecture"; Thames & Hudson Ltd., London, reprinted 2003; ISBN 0-500-27429-0
- Kiel, Machiel (1990). Ottoman Architecture in Albania, 1385-1912. Islamic art series. Vol. 5. Research Centre for Islamic History, Art and Culture. ISBN 9290633301.
- Meksi, Aleksandër (2016). "The Architecture of Mosques in Albania During the 15h to 19h Centuries [Arnavutluk'taki Cami Mimarisi]". In Muhammet Savaş Kafkasyalı (ed.). Balkanlarda Islam: Miadi Dolmayan Umut [Islam in the Balkans: Unexpired Hope]. TİKA. pp. 157–194. ISBN 978-605-9642-11-8.
