= Caferağa Medrese =

Madrasa in Istanbul, Turkey

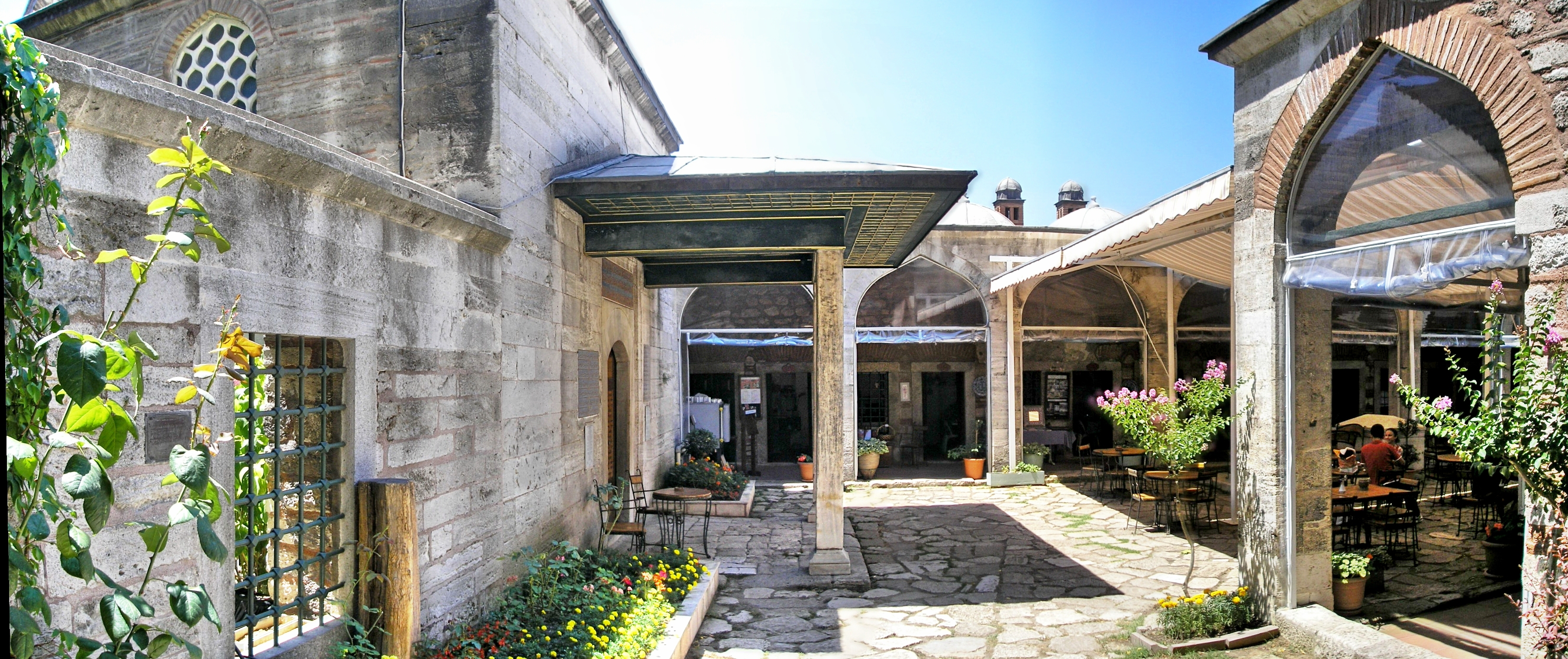
- Panoramic view of the courtyard of the Caferağa Medrese

Religion
- Affiliation: Islam
- Status: Tourist center

Location
- Location: Istanbul, Turkey
- Interactive map of Caferağa Medrese
- Coordinates: 41.00964°N 28.97883°E

Architecture
- Architect: Mimar Sinan
- Type: Madrasah
- Style: Islamic
- Completed: 1559; 467 years ago

The Caferağa Medrese or Cafer Ağa Madrasa (Turkish: Caferağa Medresesi) is a former medrese, located in Istanbul, Turkey, next to the Hagia Sophia. It was built in 1559 by Mimar Sinan on the orders of Cafer Agha, during the reign of Sultan Suleiman the Magnificent (1520–1566).

The medrese was transformed by the Turkish Cultural Service Foundation in 1989 into a tourist centre with 15 classrooms/exhibition rooms, a big salon and a garden where traditional Turkish handicrafts such as calligraphy, ceramics, jewelry and so forth are taught, made and sold. It is now recognised as an important centre of Turkish classical arts, run by the Foundation for the Service of Turkish Culture. There is an annual exhibition at the end of each year where students of various classes (ceramics, mosaics, etc.) are given a chance to show case their works which are preselected by their teachers for this particular exhibition.

The medrese is located close to the Hagia Sophia—stairs lead down to it from the small street—and to Topkapi Palace. The structure is entered through the main gate which leads into the inner courtyard, around which the former learning rooms are located. There is a restaurant inside that offers a variety of Turkish dishes.

The medrese is located within the historical centre of Istanbul's Sultanhamet district, and as such comes within the UNESCO World Heritage Site conservation area which covers the entire district.
