= Zeyrek Çinili Hamam =

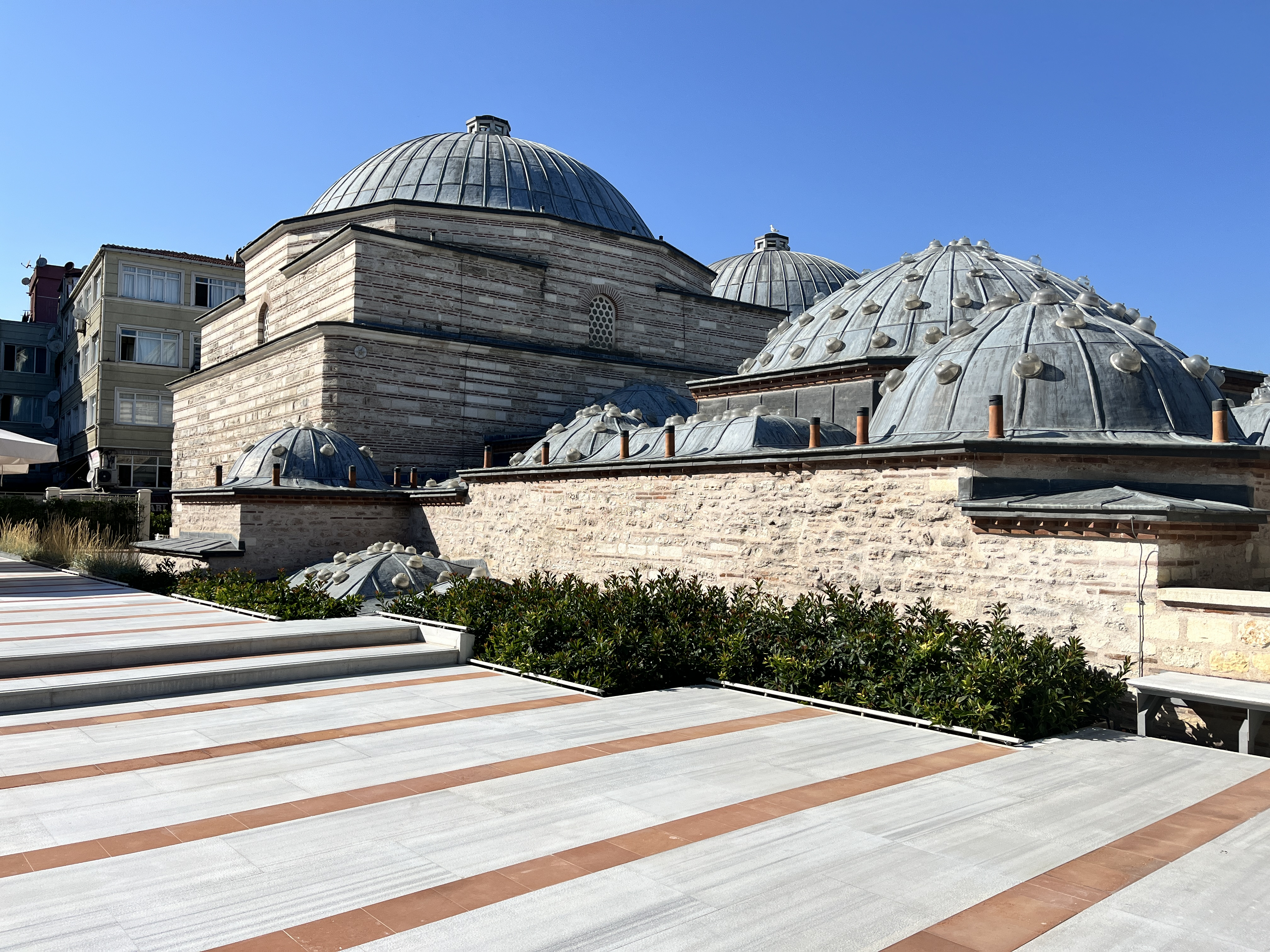
- Interactive map of the Zeyrek Çinili Hamam area

General information
- Type: Hamam
- Location: Zeyrek Istanbul, Turkey
- Completed: 16th century
- Renovated: 2010-2023
- Owner: The Marmara Collection

Design and construction
- Architect: Mimar Sinan

Zeyrek Çinili Hamam is a hamam-museum complex located in Istanbul's historic Zeyrek district.

The 16th century hamam was commissioned between 1540 and 1546 by Barbaros Hayreddin Pasha, the grand admiral of the Ottoman navy, designed by chief Ottoman architect Mimar Sinan and built atop a Byzantine-era cistern.

== Background ==
"Çinili" means "tiled" in Turkish and the name comes from distinctive blue-and-white İznik tiles that once adorned the bath's interior. The tiles of Zeyrek Çinili Hamam, damaged by the earthquakes and fires during the eighteenth century, were sold off by a Parisian antique dealer and ended up in the collections of Europe's most distinguished museums including in the collection of London’s Victoria and Albert Museum.

After laying derelict for decades, the hamam reopened in September after 13-year-long restoration. Some fragments of tiles were uncovered in excavations carried out during the restoration and currently they are displayed in a new museum adjacent the hamam.

The museum displays archaeological finds and tile fragments uncovered in excavations, insights into the hamam's ingenious heating system and water journey and Ottoman bath culture objects.

In 2024, Zeyrek Çinili Hamam recognized by TIME magazine as one of the World's Greatest Places.

== Gallery ==
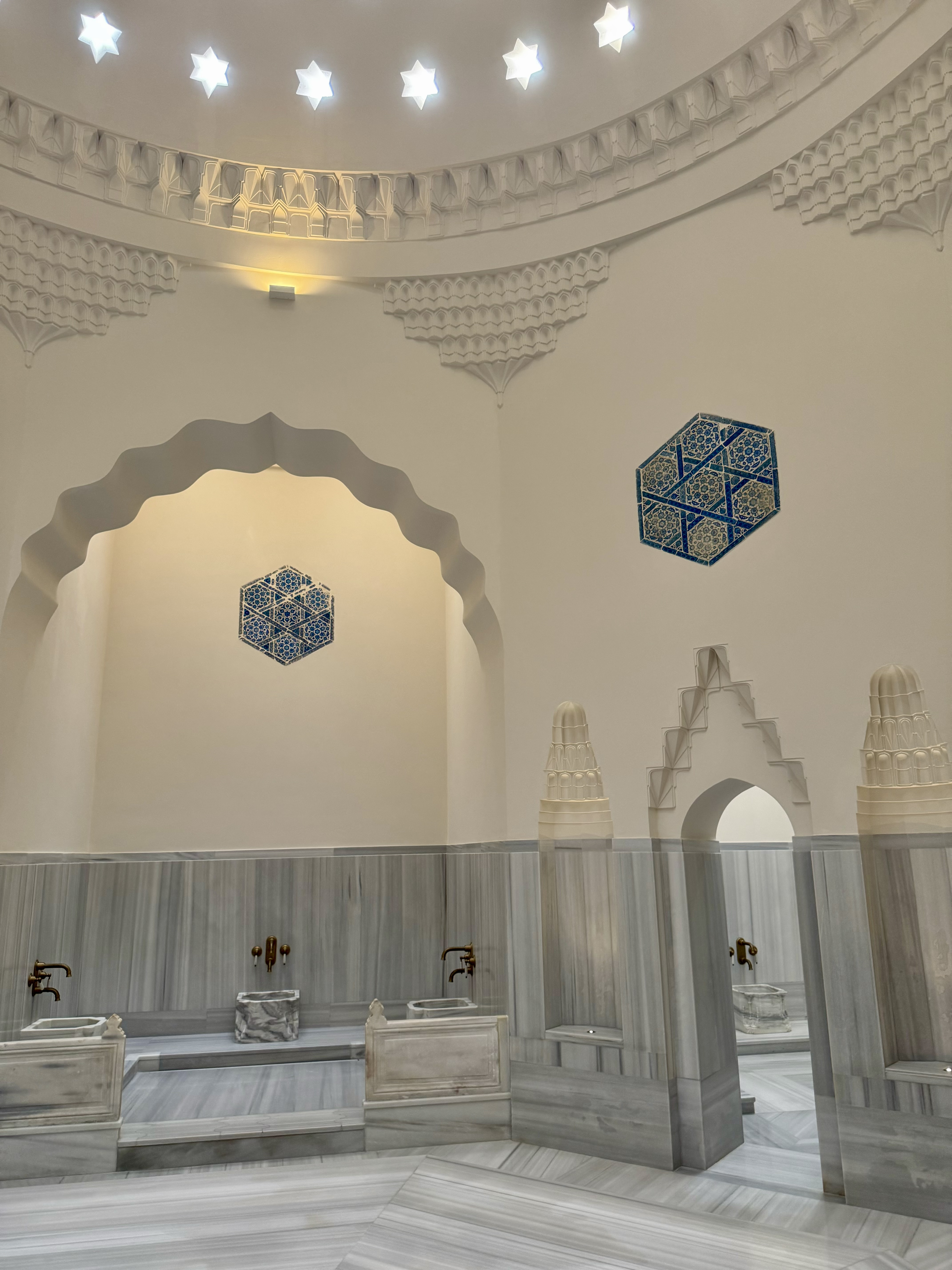
Interior

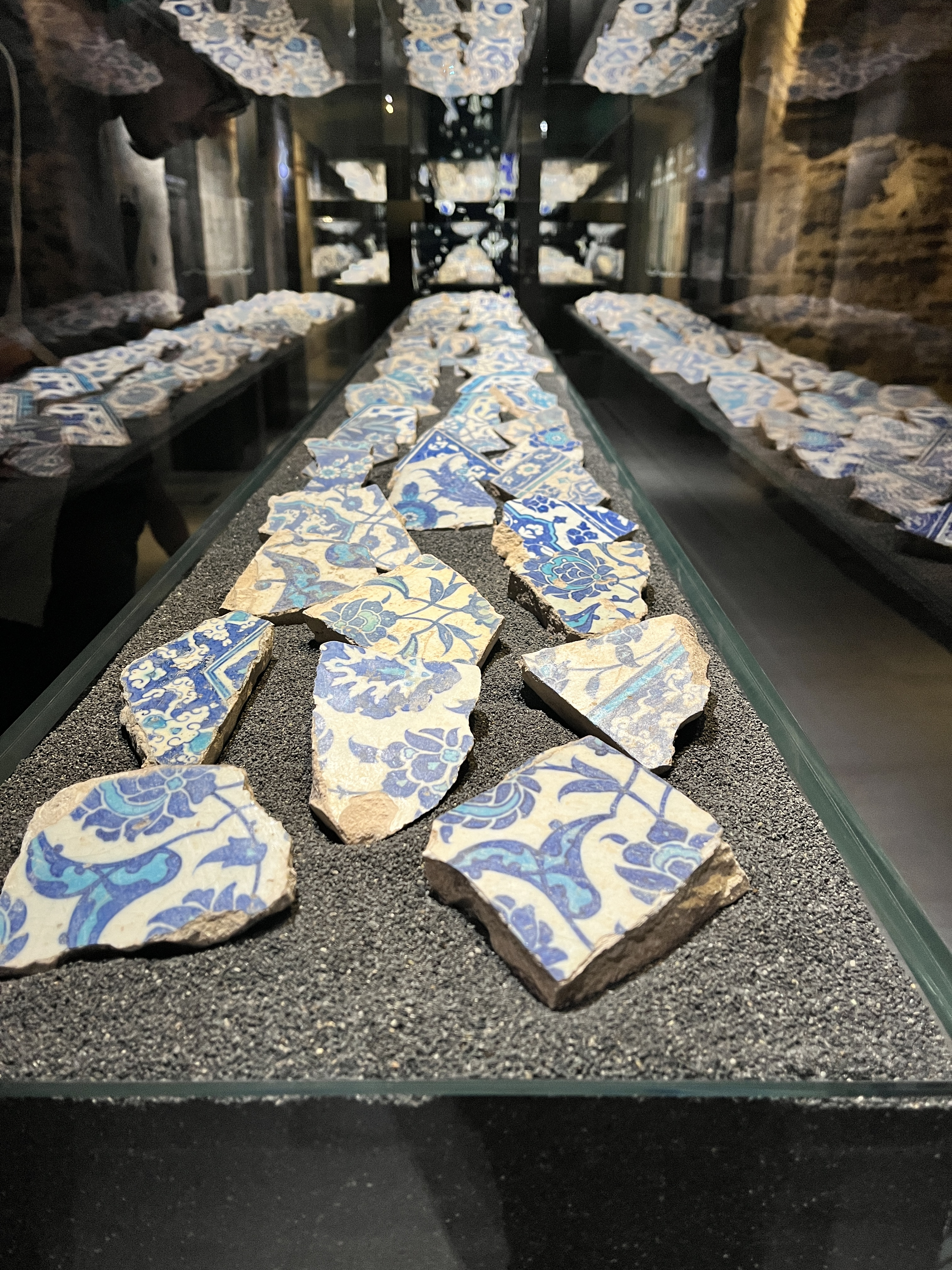
Fragments of tiles

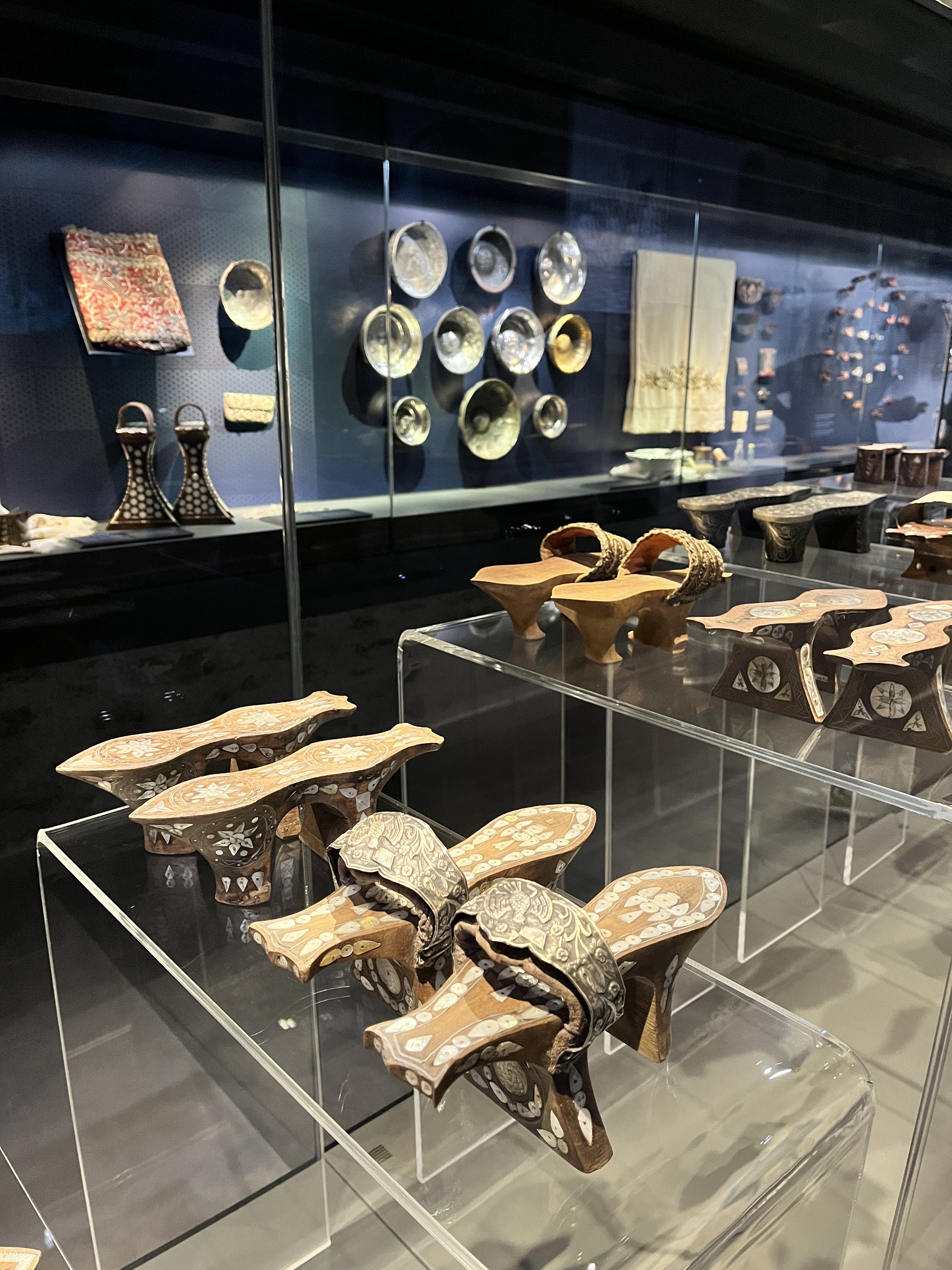
Museum displays

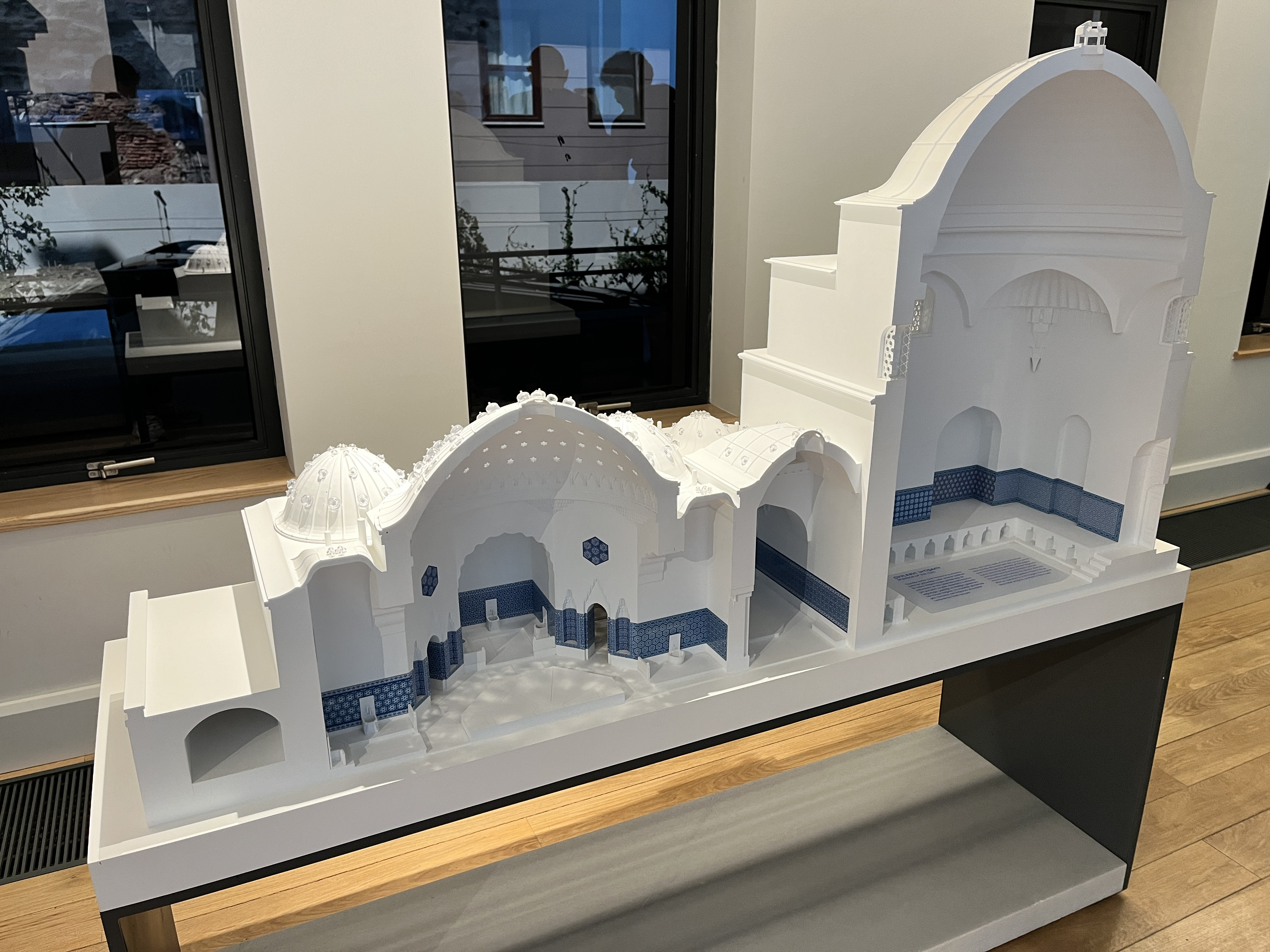
