= Yavuz Sultan Selim Medrese =

The Yavuz Sultan Selim Medrese in Istanbul was built by Mimar Sinan in memory of Selim the first from 1548 till 1550. The medrese is also known as "Yenibahce Selim Medrese". When Selim became Sultan his tent was deployed at the place where one now finds the medrese. At that time he uttered the wish to build an educational institution there. Later in 1563 by request of the population Mimar Sinan transformed the lecture hall into a mescid (small mosque) and a small minaret was added. 1914 a fire in the neighborhood slightly damaged the building. From 1918 on the former medrese was used as a public kitchen but in the same year another fire affected the building. Not until 1958 a foundation started restoring the building to use it as a Museum. The minaret lost in 1942 was not repaired. In 1962 the Türk Hat Sanatlari Museum opened its gates. During the 1980s the building was empty till the building that used to serve as Şadiye Hanım Medical Center is now serving as Medipol University's Vatan Clinic.

== Urban context ==
In the Yavuz Sultan Selim Medreses surrounding area there is a public fountain and the tomb of Shah Huban Hatun as well as an ancient monastery, which consists of two churches, constructed at different times. The first was built by Constantine Lips, a functionary of Leo VI and Constantine VII Porphyrogenitus in 908 and dedicated to the Theotokos. After 1261 the Empress Theodora added another church with a chapel dedicated to St. John the Baptist. It was converted to the Fenari Isa Mosque in 1496 and was abandoned in the early 20th century after a fire, which completely destroyed the monastery.

== Architecture ==
The madras has a typical "u-plan" with a row of arcades and rooms on three sides surrounding a courtyard. On the fourth side one finds the lecture hall, which is covered by a large dome. When the lecture hall was transformed into a mescid a minaret was added. A wall with two entrances surrounds the madras whereas a domed entrance hall indicates the main entrance. After passing the entrance hall one arrives in a sort of forecourt. The passages to the main court are located on the sides of the lecture hall. The porch of the lecture hall looms into the courtyard and in the center a small fountain completes the ensemble. A small ewan is located in the south west of the "u-structure". Although the adjacent rooms are not bigger than the standard rooms the access via the ewan makes them of a higher importance and indicates a different usage. Interesting to mention is a small passage in the east. It leads to the enclosed garden surrounding the madrasa. A small jutty serves a visual cover which indicates that the toilets were located there. The rooms shown in the plan are new but also serve as toilets now.

== Present urban context ==
If one approaches the madras from the crossroads in the north, one hardly recognizes the old building. The madras building itself is wallpapered with signs that do not allow a free glance at the monument. Due to a rise of land of about two meters the building seems very low from a far point of view. The dual four-lane Vatan Caddesi without a real pedestrian crossing also complicates the access. The nowadays Halicilar Koskü Caddesi which would connect the Fenari Isa Mosque, the madrasa and the tombs is dominated by new cross-cuts like the Vatan and Oguzhan Caddesi.

== Gallery ==
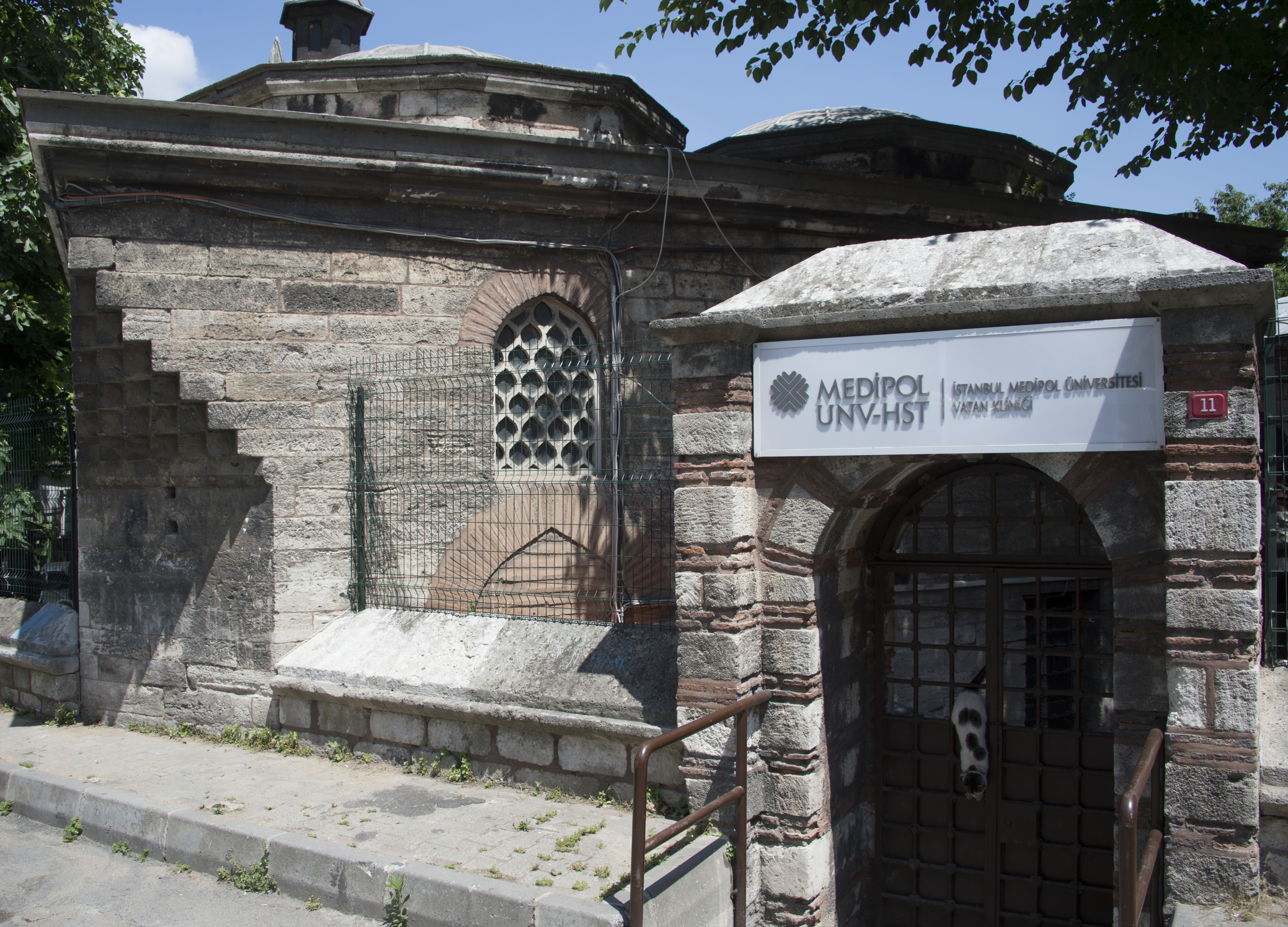
Istanbul Yavuz Selim Medresi 8999

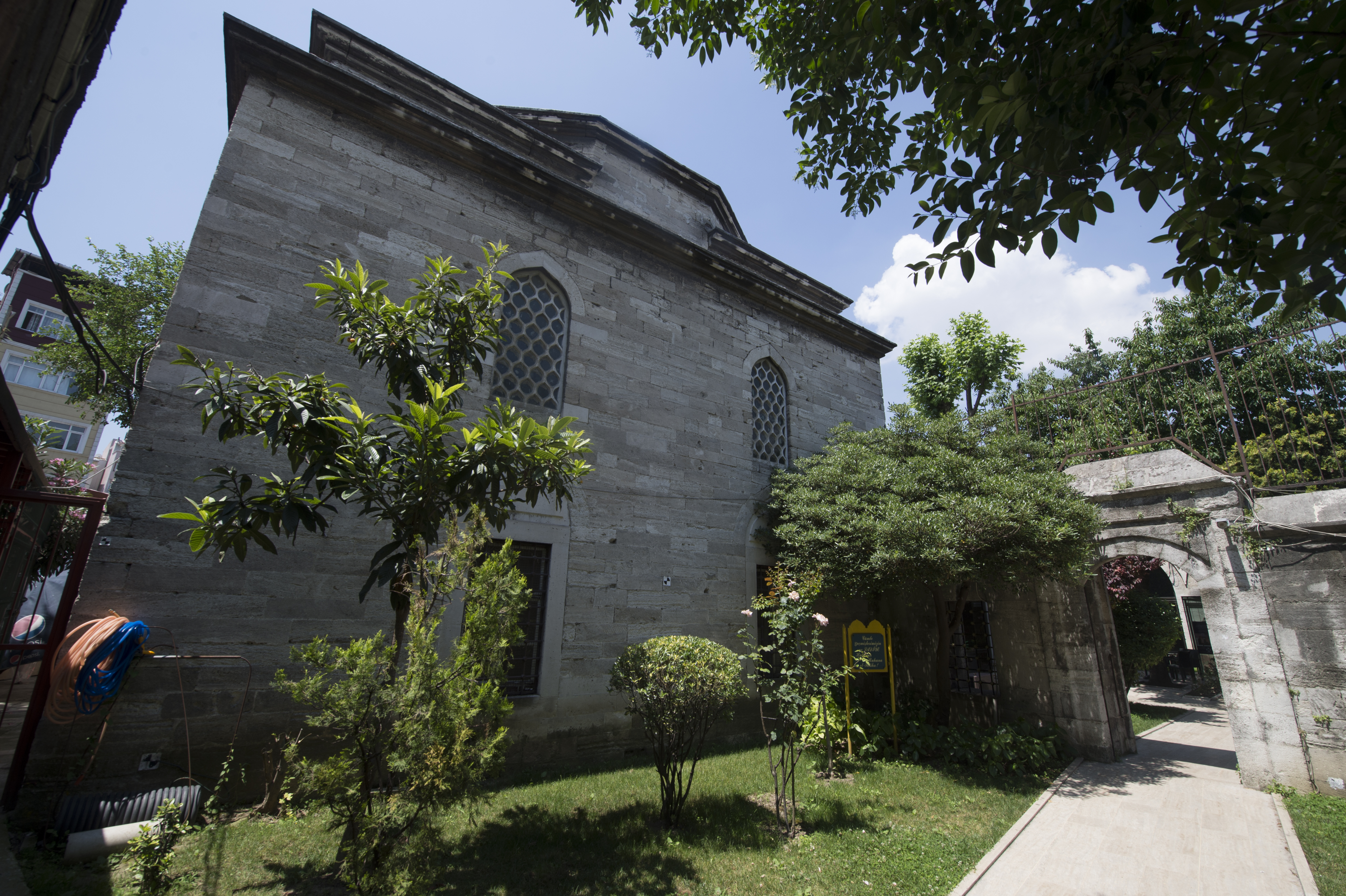
Istanbul Yavuz Selim Medresi 9006

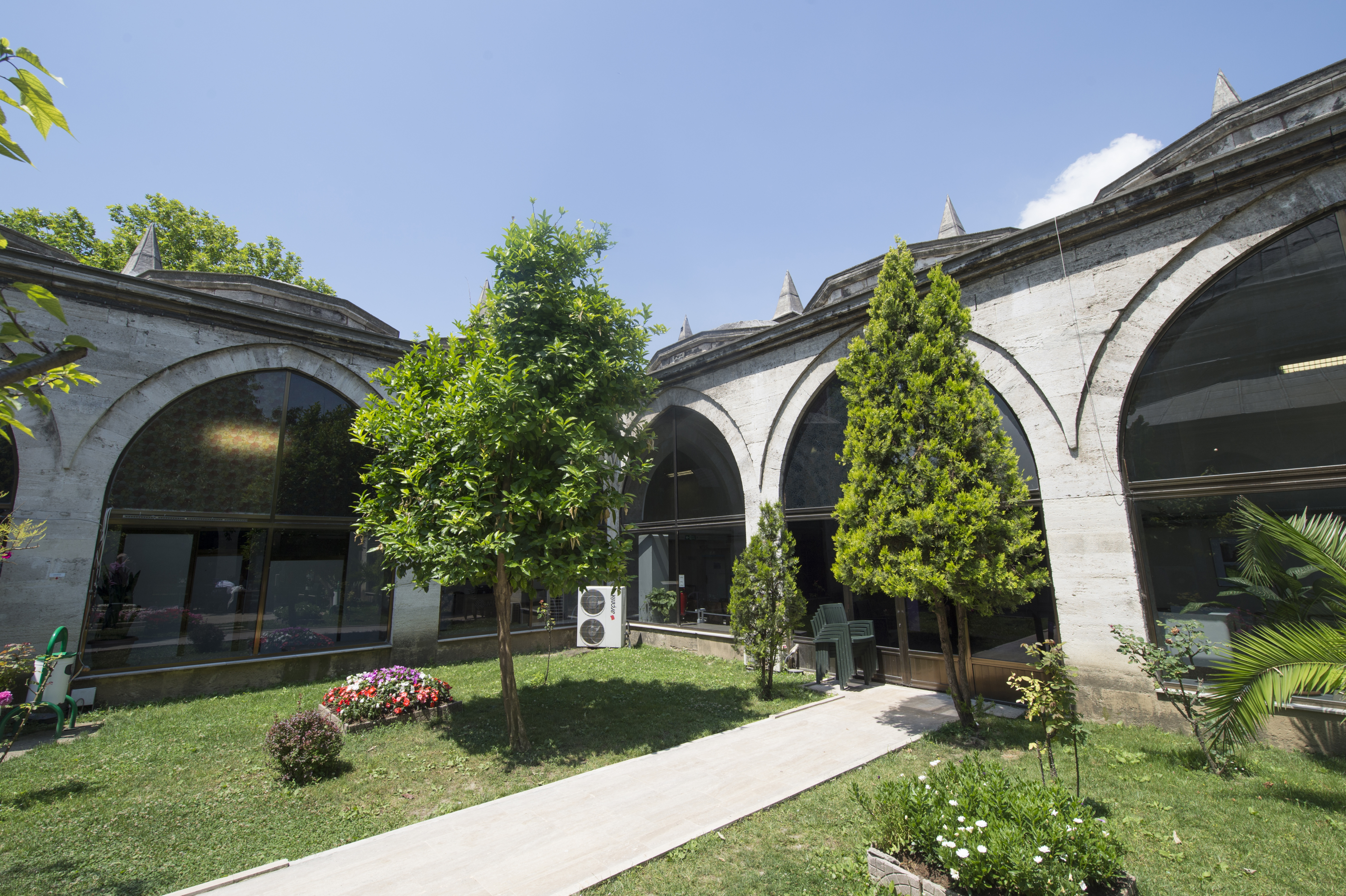
Istanbul Yavuz Selim Medresi 9005

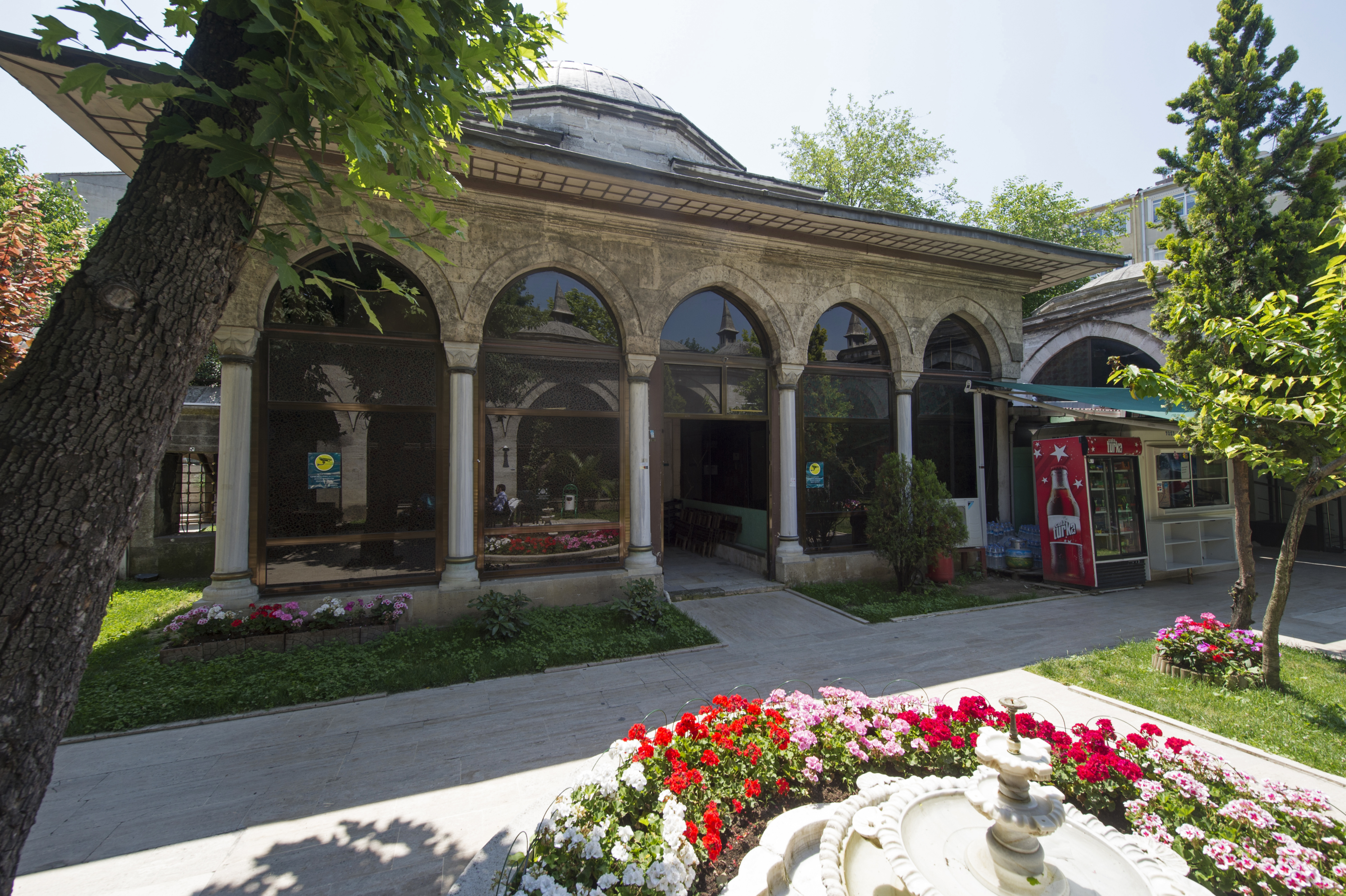
Istanbul Yavuz Selim Medresi 9003

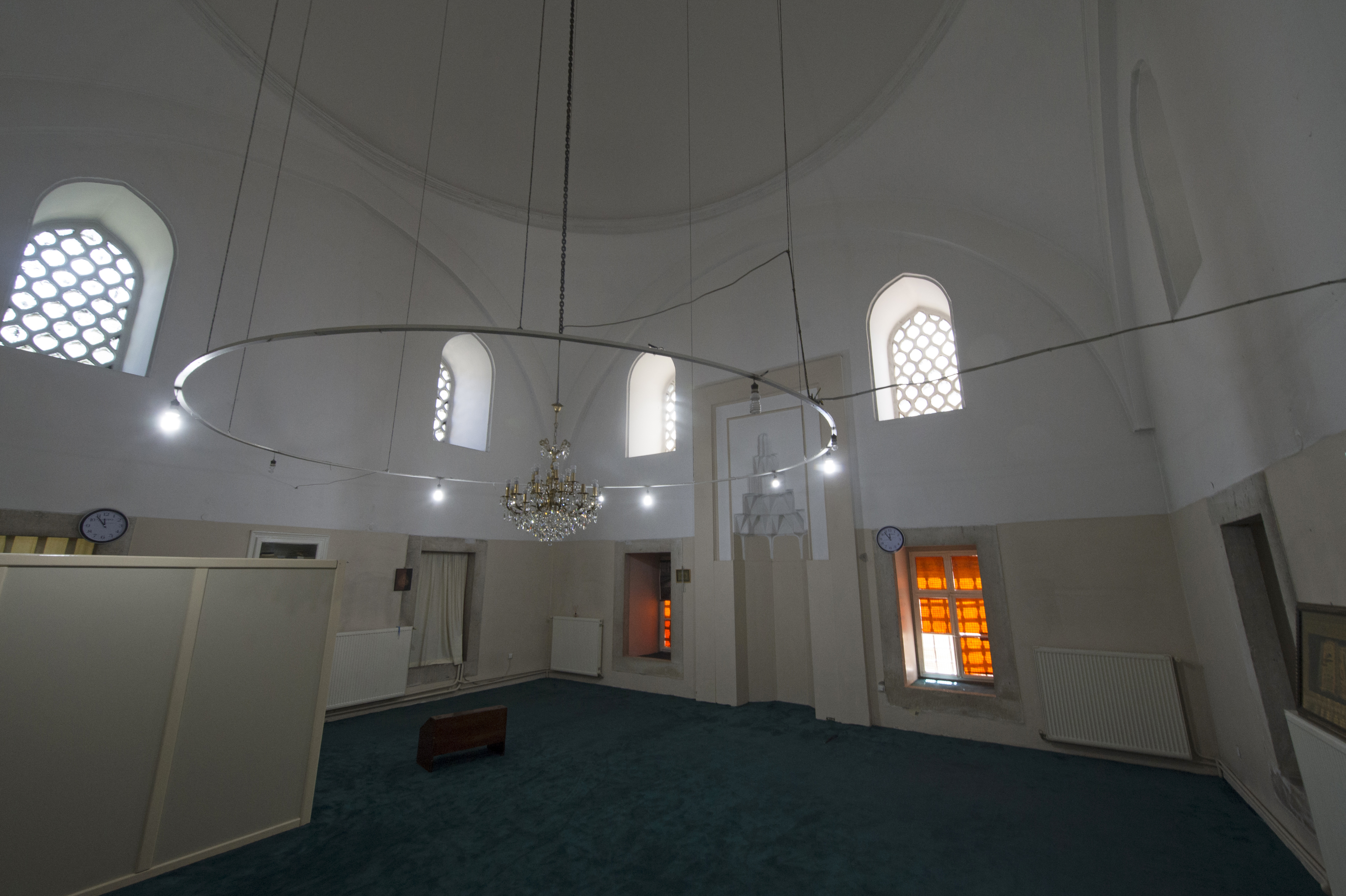
Istanbul Yavuz Selim Medresi 9001
