= Godfrey Goodwin (scholar) =

Godfrey Goodwin (Lisbon, 24 February 1921 – 18 August 2005) was a scholar who published works on Ottoman architecture and culture. He is best known for his major work, A History of Ottoman Architecture, first published in 1971, which remains a standard English-language reference on Ottoman architecture.

== Biography ==
Godfrey was born in Lisbon, Portugal, where his father was an engineer for a British company. After his father's death in 1923, his family moved back to England, where he went to school at Clifton College in Bristol, then pursued his education at the French Institute and the RADA in London. He joined the British army in 1939 and served during the Second World War, which took him to many locations, including Rome, where his interest and education in architecture was fostered. In 1952, he moved to Turkey and began teaching at an English school in Istanbul, before joining the faculty of Robert College (present-day Boğaziçi University) in 1958 as assistant professor of art and architectural history.

He met Gillian Chorley in 1965, his future wife. They moved to London a few years later and had a son in 1968. After completing and publishing A History of Ottoman Architecture (1971), he became a teacher at a primary school. In the 1980s he served as a director and librarian at the Royal Asiatic Society. After his wife died in 2000, he moved back to Turkey and taught courses on Ottoman architecture at Boğaziçi University.

== Selected bibliography ==
- Goodwin, Godfrey (1971). A History of Ottoman Architecture. New York: Thames & Hudson. ISBN 0500274290.
- Goodwin, Godfrey (1977). "The Reuse of Marble in the Eastern Mediterranean in Medieval Times". Journal of the Royal Asiatic Society of Great Britain and Ireland (1): 17–30. ISSN 0035-869X.
- Goodwin, Godfrey (1988). "Gardens of the Dead in Ottoman Times". Muqarnas. 5: 61–69. doi:10.2307/1523110. ISSN 0732-2992.
- Goodwin, Godfrey (1997). The Janissaries. Saqi Books. ISBN 978-0-86356-781-0.
- Goodwin, Godfrey (1997). The Private World of Ottoman Women. Saqi Books. ISBN 978-0-86356-745-2.
- Goodwin, Godfrey (1999). Topkapi Palace: An Illustrated Guide to Its Life & Personalities. Saqi Books. ISBN 978-0-86356-067-5.
