= Fatih =

- District and municipality
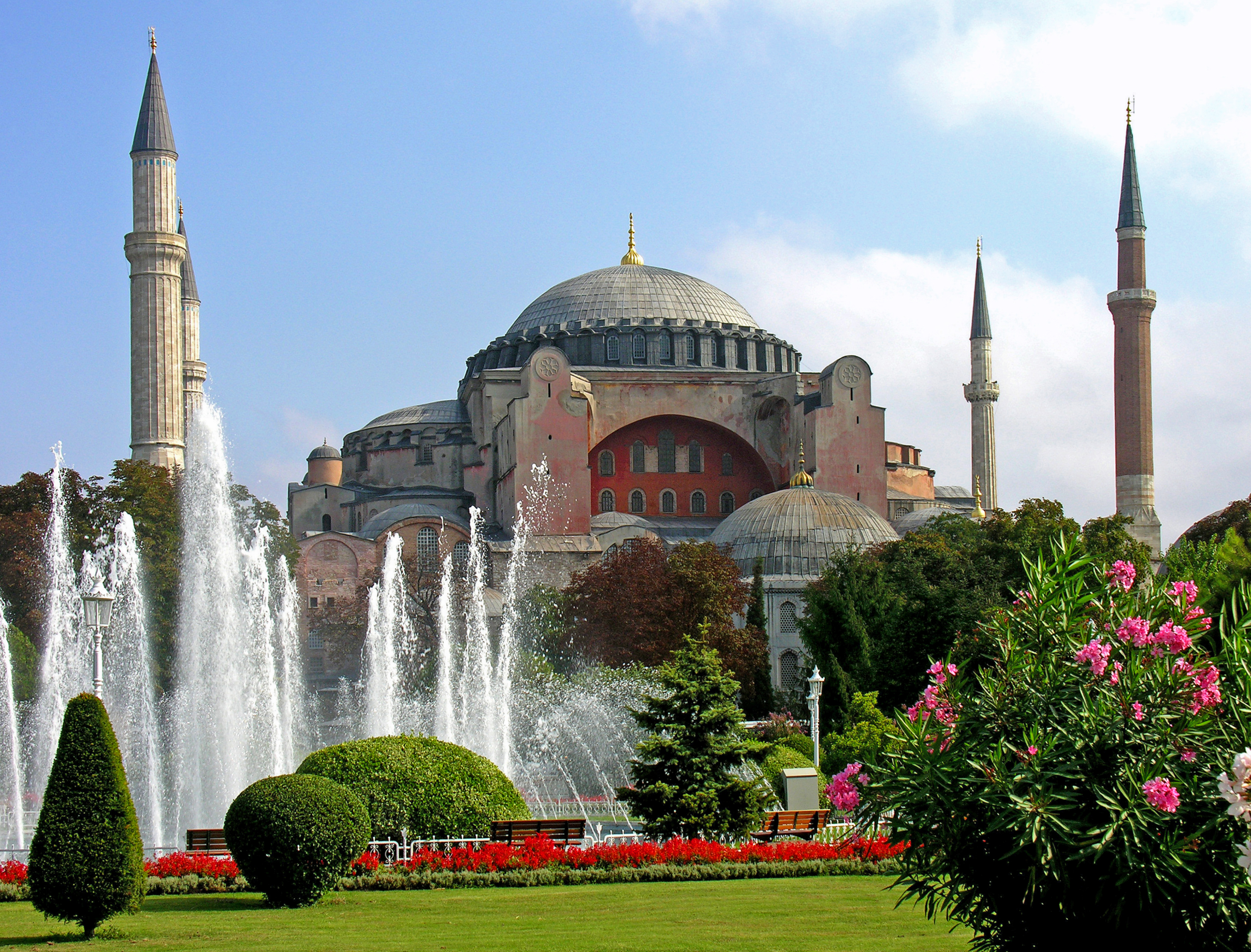
- Hagia Sophia in Fatih

- Logo

- Map showing Fatih District in Istanbul Province

- Location within Turkey Location within Istanbul
- Coordinates: 41°01′03″N 28°56′26″E
- Country: Turkey
- Province: Istanbul

Government
  - Mayor: Mehmet Ergün Turan (AKP)
- Area: 15 km^{2} (5.8 sq mi)
- Population (2022): 368,227
  - Density: 25,000/km^{2} (64,000/sq mi)
- Time zone: UTC+3 (TRT)
- Area code: 0212
- Website: www.fatih.bel.tr

Fatih (Turkish pronunciation: [ˈfaːtih]) or the Historical peninsula (in Turkish: Tarihi Yarımada), is a municipality and district of Istanbul Province, Turkey. Its area is 15 km^{2} (5.8 sq mi), and its population is 368,227 as of 2022. It is home to almost all of the provincial authorities (including the mayor's office, police headquarters, metropolitan municipality and tax office) but not the courthouse. It encompasses the historical peninsula, coinciding with old Constantinople. In 2009, the district of Eminönü, which had been a separate municipality located at the tip of the peninsula, was once again remerged into Fatih because of its small population. Fatih is bordered by the Golden Horn to the north and the Sea of Marmara to the south, while the Western border is demarked by the Theodosian wall and the east by the Bosphorus Strait.

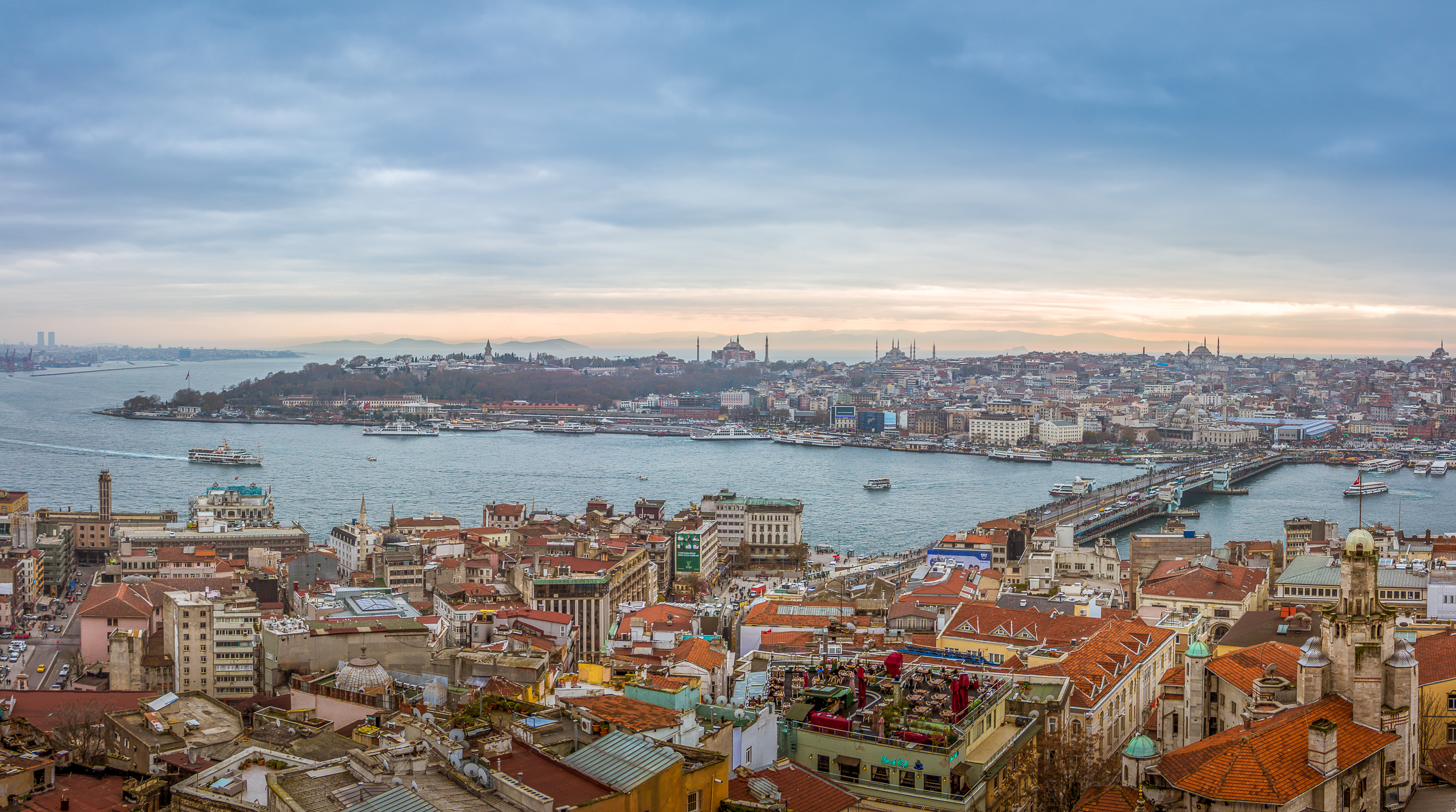
Panorama of Istanbul taken from Galata Tower. Shown from left to right: The Asian side of Istanbul, Topkapi palace, Hagia Sophia, the Blue Mosque, Galata bridge and New Mosque.

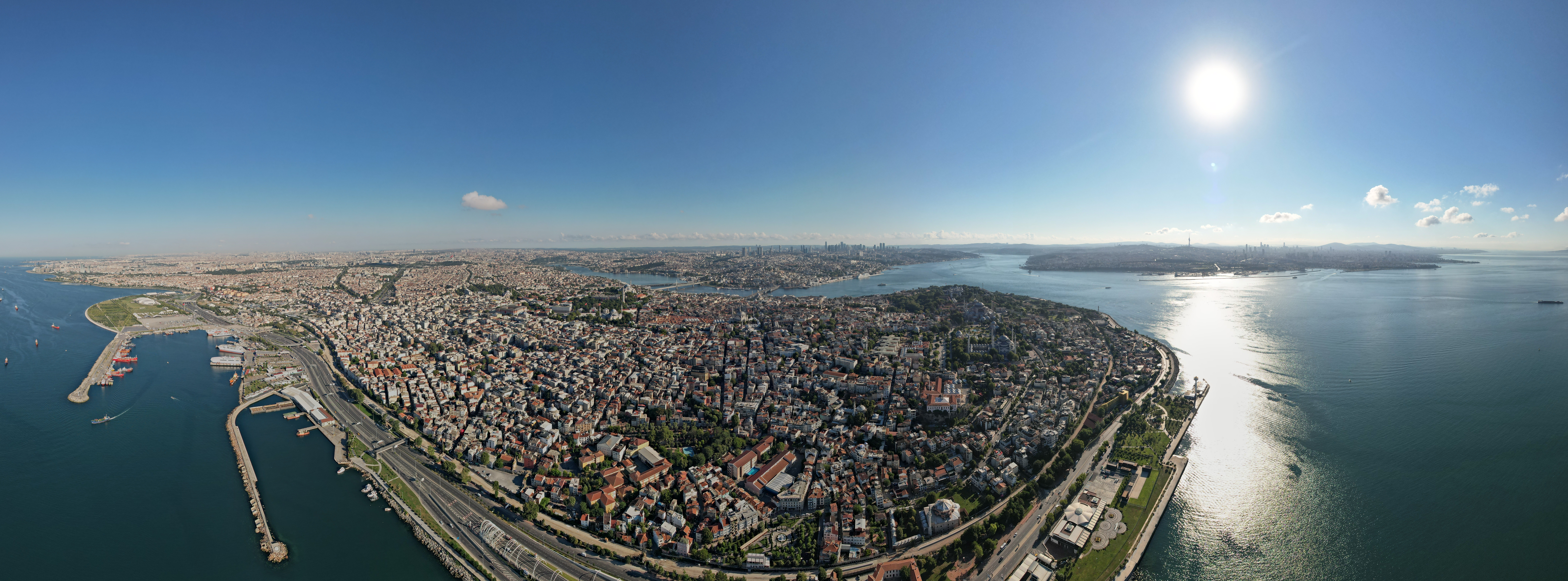
Panorama of Fatih

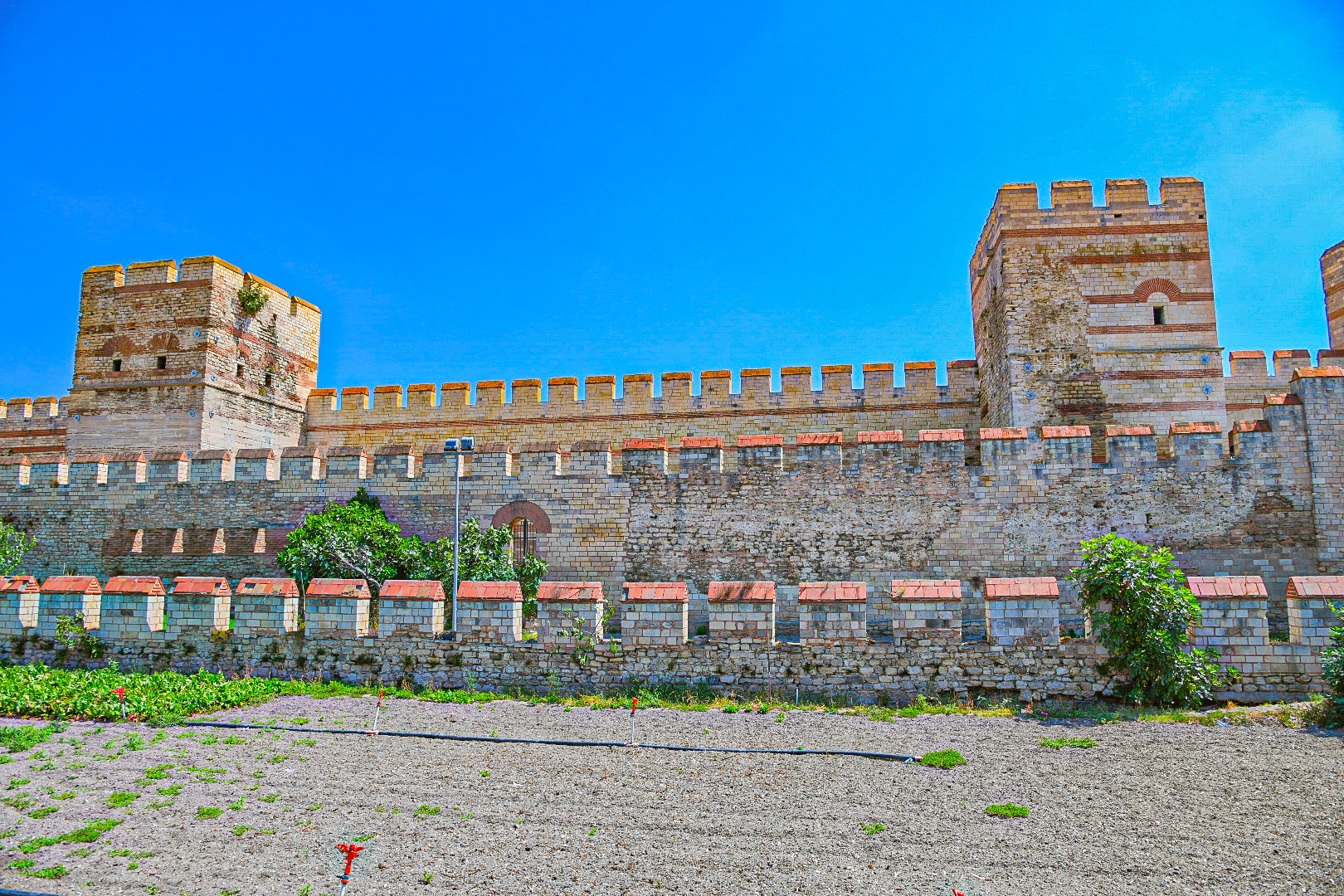
The Great Walls of Constantinople

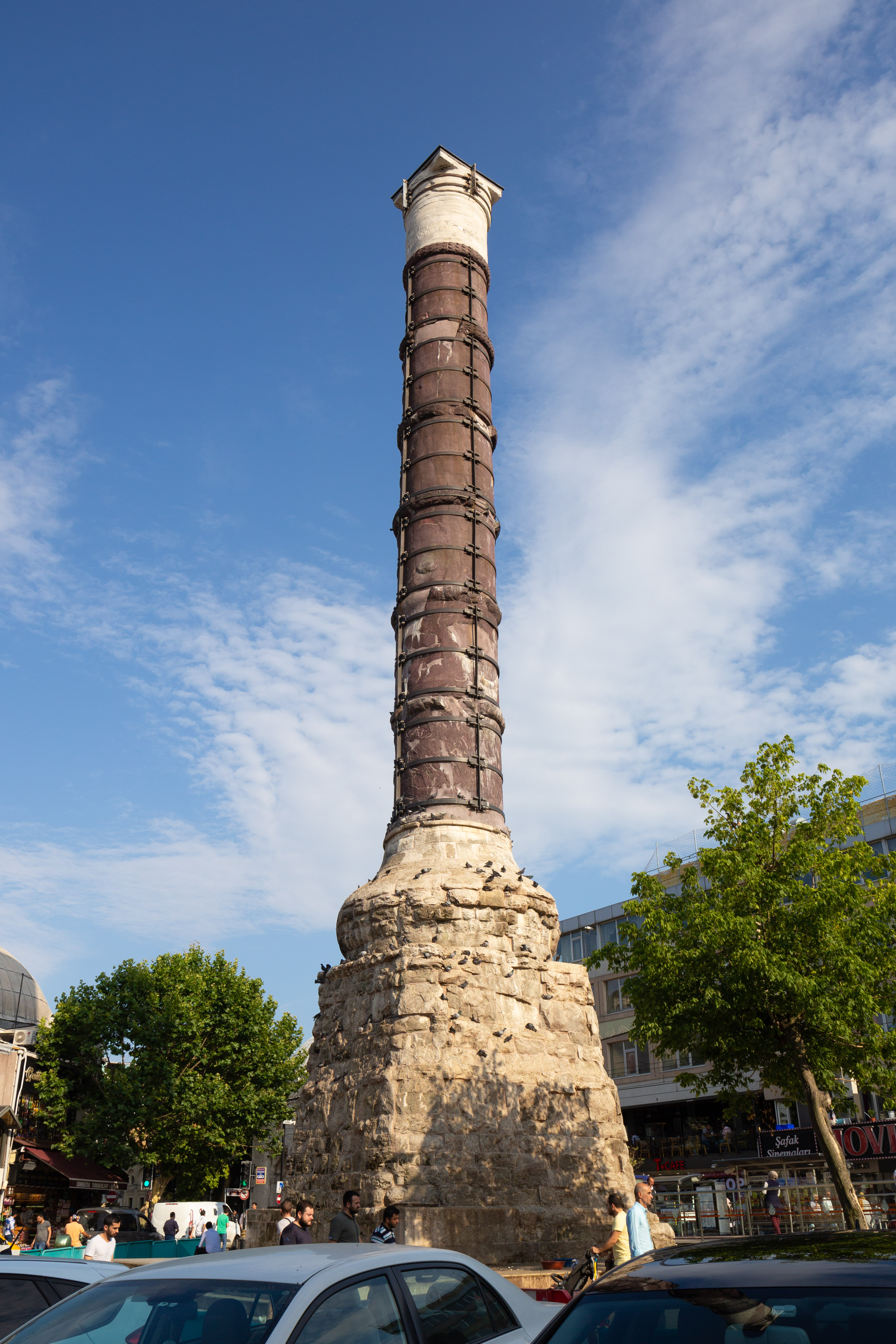
Column of Constantine

== History ==
=== Byzantine era ===
Historic Byzantine districts encompassed by present-day Fatih include: Exokiónion, Aurelianae, Xerólophos, ta Eleuthérou, Helenianae, ta Dalmatoú, Sígma, Psamátheia, ta Katakalón, Paradeísion, ta Olympíou, ta Kýrou, Peghé, Rhéghion, ta Elebíchou, Leomákellon, ta Dexiokrátous, Petríon or Pétra, Phanàrion, Exi Mármara (Altımermer), Philopátion, Deúteron and Vlachernaí.

=== Ottoman period ===
The name "Fatih" comes from the Ottoman emperor Fatih Sultan Mehmed (Mehmed the Conqueror or Mehmed II), and means "Conqueror" in Turkish, from Arabic. The Fatih Mosque built by Mehmed II is in this district, while his resting place is next to the mosque and is much visited. Fatih Mosque was built on the ruins of the Church of the Holy Apostles, destroyed by earthquakes and years of war. A large madrasa complex was also built around the mosque.

Immediately after the conquest, groups of Islamic scholars transformed the major churches of Hagia Sophia and the Pantocrator (today the Zeyrek Mosque) into mosques, but the Fatih Mosque and its surrounding complex was the first purpose-built Islamic seminary within the city walls. The building of the mosque complex ensured that the area continued to thrive beyond the conquest; markets grew up to support the thousands of workers involved in the building and to supply them with materials, and then to service the students in the seminary. The area quickly became a Turkish neighbourhood with a particularly pious character due to the seminary. Some of this piety has endured until today.

Following the conquest, the Edirnekapı (meaning Edirne Gate) gate in the city walls became the major exit to Thrace, and this rejuvenated the neighbourhoods overlooking the Golden Horn. The Fatih Mosque was on the road to Edirnekapı and the Fatih district became the most populous area of the city in the early Ottoman period and in the 16th century more mosques and markets were built in this area, including: Iskender Pasha Mosque, once famous as a centre for the Naqshbandi order in Turkey); Hirka-i-Sharif Mosque, which houses the cloak of Muhammad (the mosque is in common use but the cloak is only on show during the month of Ramadan; the Jerrahi Tekke; The Sunbul Efendi Tekke and the Ramazan Efendi Tekke both in the Kocamustafapaşa district and the Vefa Kilise Mosque, originally a Byzantine church. The last four were named after the founders of various Sufi orders, and Sheikh Ebü’l Vefa in particular was of major importance in the city and was very fond of Fatih. Many other mosques, schools, baths, and fountains in the area were built by military leaders and officials in the Ottoman court. From the 18th century onwards, Istanbul started to grow outside the walls, and then began the transformation of Fatih into the heavily residential district, dominated by concrete apartment housing, that it remains today. This process was accelerated over the years by fires which destroyed whole neighbourhoods of wooden houses, and a major earthquake in 1766, which destroyed the Fatih Mosque and many of the surrounding buildings (subsequently rebuilt). Fires continued to ravage the old city, and the wide roads that run through the area today are a legacy of all that burning. There are few wooden buildings left in Fatih today, although right up until the 1960s, the area was covered with narrow streets of wooden buildings. Nowadays, the district is largely made up of narrow streets with tightly packed 5- or 6-floor apartment buildings. The confectioner Hafiz Mustafa 1864 was founded in 1864 by Hadji İsmail Hakkı Beyat what is today Hamidiye street in the district during the reign of Sultan Abdulaziz.

== Fatih today ==
At present, Fatih contains areas including Aksaray, Fındıkzade, Çapa, and Vatan Caddesi that are more cosmopolitan than the conservative image which the district has in the eyes of many people. With Eminönü, which was again officially a part of the Fatih district until 1928, and with its historical Byzantine walls, conquered by Mehmed II, Fatih is the "real Istanbul" of the old times, before the recent enlargement of the city that began in the 19th century. The area has become more and more crowded from the 1960s onwards, and a large portion of the middle-class residents have moved to the Anatolian side and other parts of the city. Fatih today is largely a working-class district, but being a previously wealthy area, it is well-resourced, with a more thoroughly established community than the newly built areas such as Bağcılar or Esenler to the west, which are almost entirely inhabited by post-1980s migrants who came to the city in desperate circumstances. Fatih was built with some degree of central planning by the municipality. Istanbul University which was founded in 1453 is in Fatih. In addition, since 1586, the Orthodox Christian Patriarchate of Constantinople has had its headquarters in the relatively modest Church of St. George in the Fener neighborhood of Fatih.

Fatih has many theatres, including the famous Reşat Nuri Sahnesi. The area is well-served with a number of schools, hospitals and public amenities in general. A number of Istanbul's longest-established hospitals are in Fatih, including the Istanbul University teaching hospitals of Çapa and Cerrahpaşa, the Haseki Public Hospital, the Samatya Public Hospital, and the Vakıf Gureba Public Hospital. A tramway runs from the docks at Sirkeci, through Sultanahmet, and finally to Aksaray, which is a part of Fatih.

Also, besides the headquarters, some main units of the Istanbul Metropolitan Municipality, including the city's fire department, are based in Fatih.

Fatih has many historic and modern libraries, including the Edirnekapı Halk Kütüphanesi, Fener Rum Patrikhanesi Kütüphanesi (the Library of the Patriarchate), Hekimoğlu Ali Paşa Halk Kütüphanesi, İstanbul University Library, İstanbul University Cerrahpaşa Tıp Fakültesi Kütüphanesi, İstanbul Üniversitesi Kardiyoloji Ensitütüsü Kütüphanesi, İstanbul Üniversitesi Tıp Fakültesi Hulusi Behçet Kitaplığı, İstanbul Büyükşehir Belediyesi Kadın Eserleri Kütüphanesi, Millet Kütüphanesi, Mizah Kütüphanesi, Murat Molla Halk Kütüphanesi, Ragıppaşa Kütüphanesi, and Yusufpaşa Halk Kütüphanesi.

On the other hand, today Fatih is known as one of the most conservative religious areas of Istanbul because of the religious residents of the Çarşamba quarter which is essentially a very minor part of this historical district. Çarşamba is famous with bearded men in heavy coats, the traditional baggy 'shalwar' trousers and Islamic turban; while women dressed in full black gowns are a common sight as this area is popular with members of a Naqshbandi Sufi order affiliated to Sheikh Mahmut Ustaosmanoğlu. Conservative political parties always do well in this area. Küçükçekmece, Başakşehir, Bağcılar, Gaziosmanpaşa, Esenler, Bayrampaşa, Zeytinburnu, and Fatih are home to asylum seekers of Syrian origin.

== Neighborhoods ==
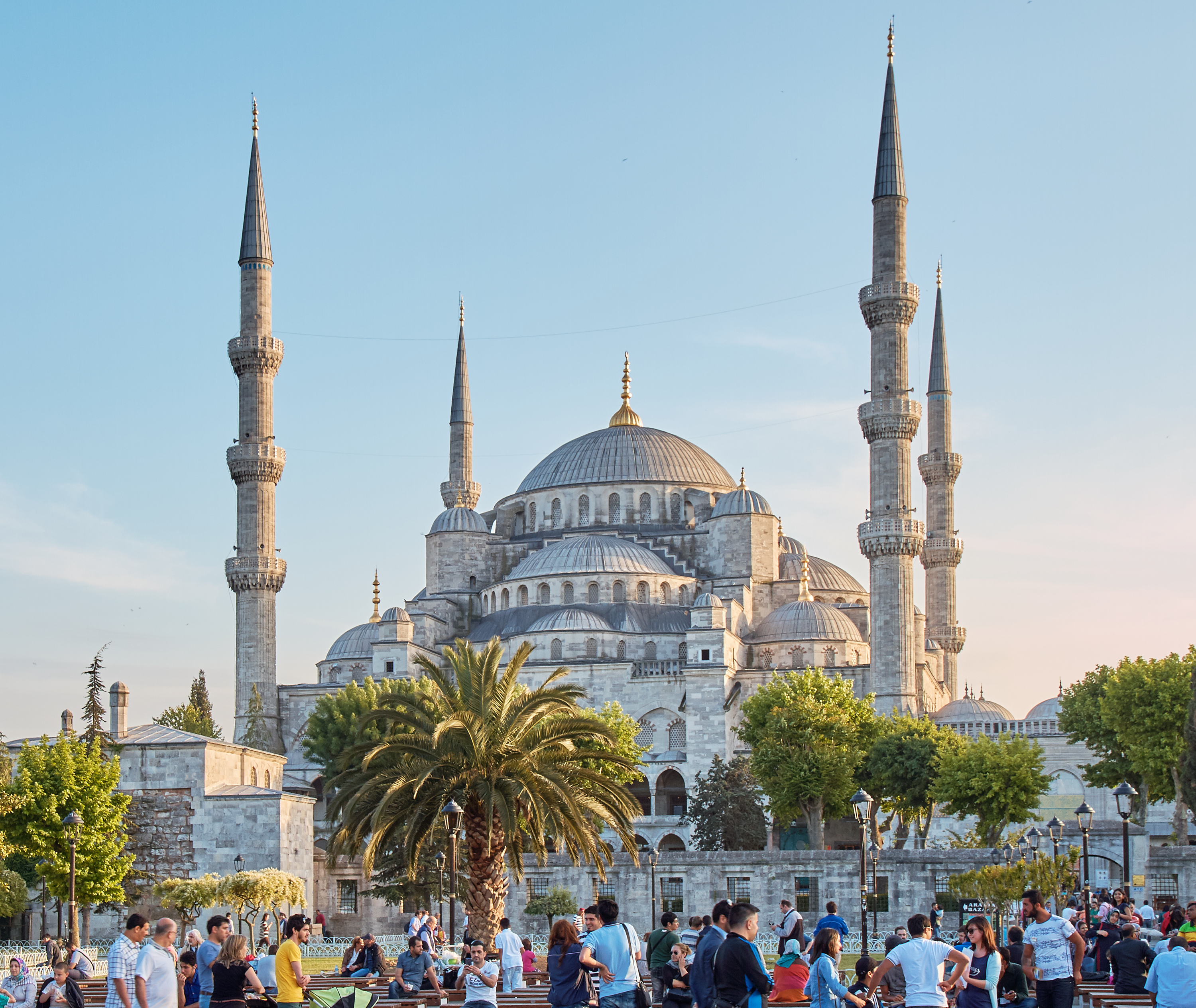
The Blue Mosque is a marvel of Classical Ottoman architecture in Istanbul

There are 57 neighbourhoods in Fatih District:

- Aksaray
- Akşemsettin
- Alemdar
- Ali Kuşçu
- Atikali
- Ayvansaray
- Balabanağa
- Balat
- Beyazıt
- Binbirdirek
- Cankurtaran
- Cerrahpaşa
- Cibali
- Demirtaş
- Derviş Ali
- Emin Sinan
- Hacı Kadın
- Haseki Sultan
- Hırka-İ Şerif
- Hobyar
- Hoca Gıyasettin
- Hocapaşa
- İskenderpaşa
- Kalenderhane
- Karagümrük
- Katip Kasım
- Kemalpaşa
- Koca Mustafapaşa
- Küçük Ayasofya
- Mercan
- Mesihpaşa
- Mevlanakapı
- Mimar Hayrettin
- Mimar Kemalettin
- Mollafenari
- Mollagürani
- Molla Hüsrev
- Muhsine Hatun
- Nişanca
- Rüstempaşa
- Saraç İshak
- Sarıdemir
- Şehremini
- Şehsuvar Bey
- Seyyid Ömer
- Silivrikapı
- Süleymaniye
- Sultan Ahmet (Sultanahmet)
- Sümbül Efendi
- Sururi
- Tahtakale
- Taya Hatun
- Topkapı
- Yavuz Sinan
- Yavuz Sultan Selim
- Yedikule
- Zeyrek

== Historical sites ==
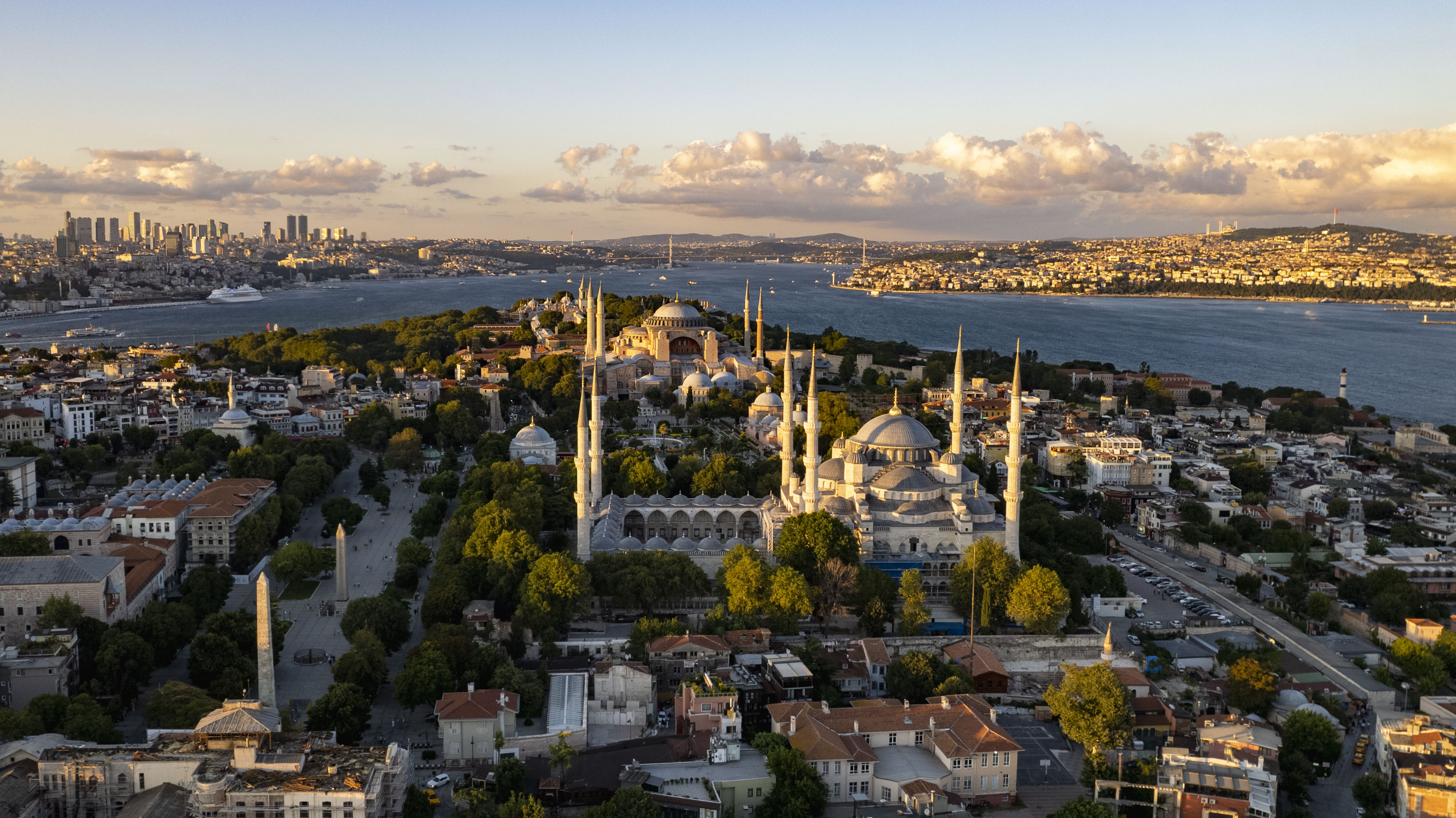
View of the Blue Mosque, Hagia Sophia, and old Istanbul

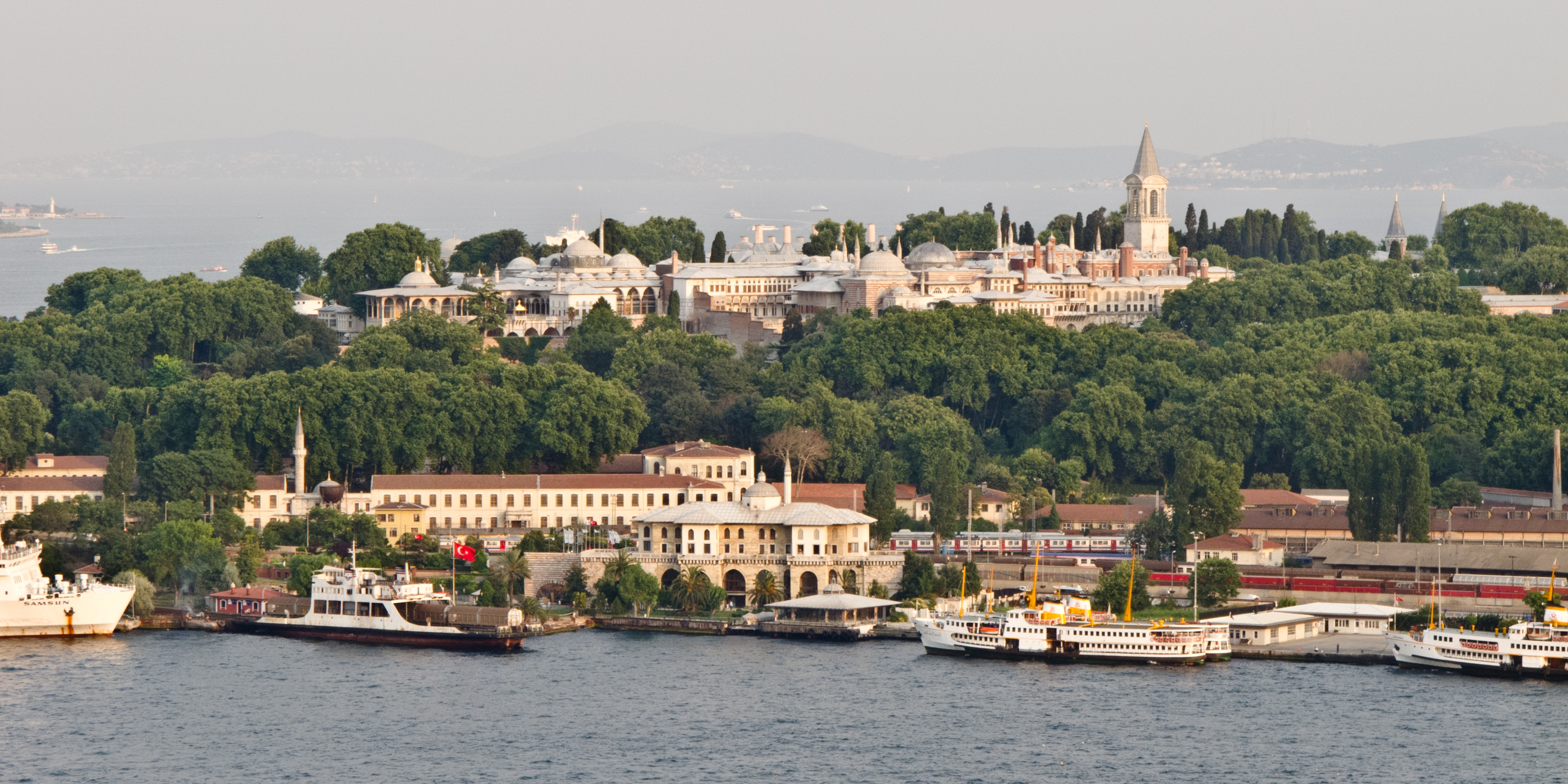
- View of the Topkapı Palace from the Golden Horn
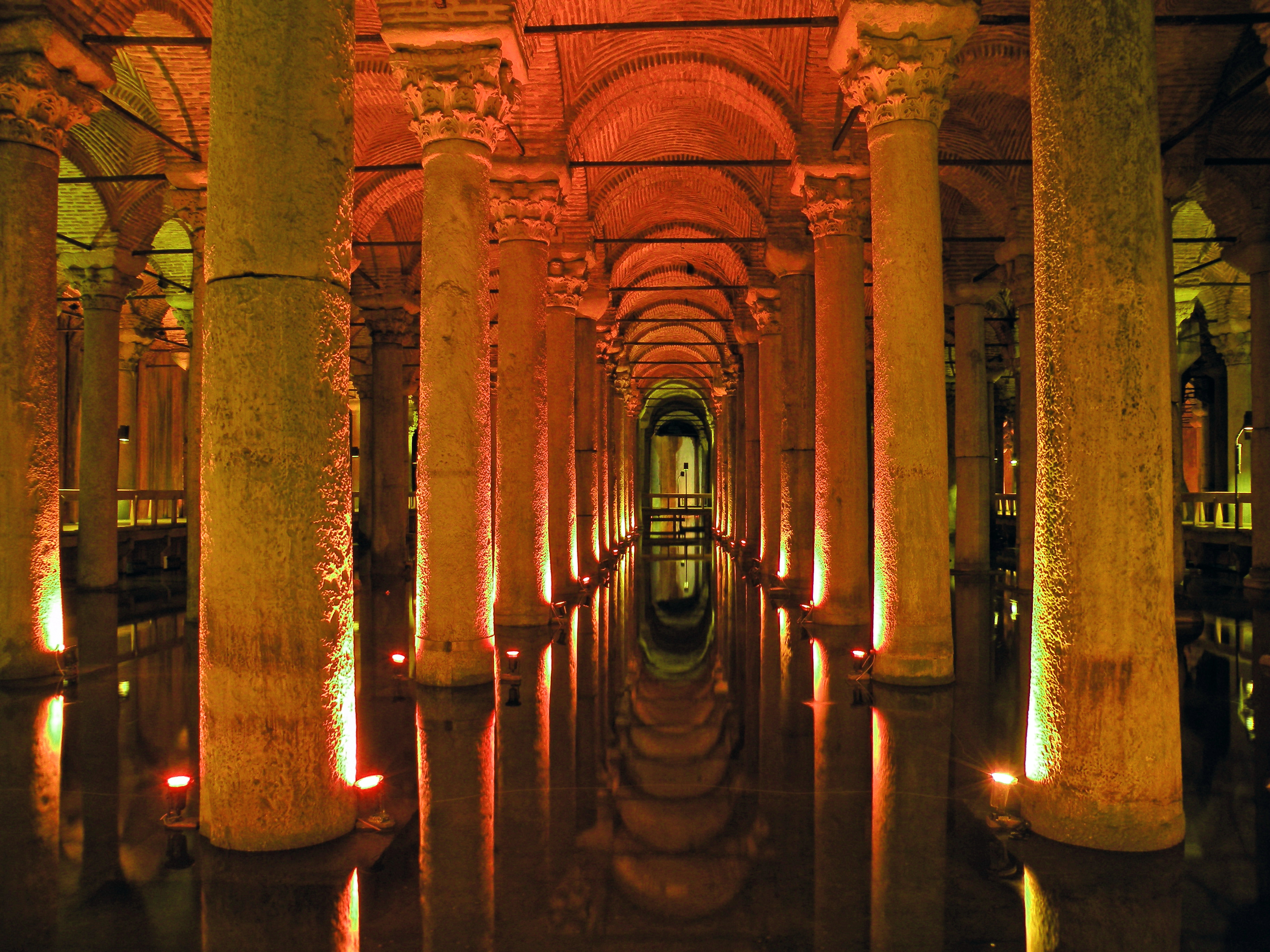
  The Basilica Cistern
  Topkapı Palace - historical residence of the Ottoman sultans
- Hagia Sophia - historical patriarchal cathedral of the Eastern Orthodox Church in the Byzantine Empire's capital city, later converted into a mosque, then a museum, then a mosque again.
- Süleymaniye – the huge mosque complex of Suleiman the Magnificent;
- Turkish and Islamic Arts Museum – formerly the palace of Pargalı Ibrahim Pasha, a prominent grand vizier during the early reign of Suleiman the Magnificent.
- Yeni Mosque (The new mosque) – the mosque that dominates the waterfront by the Galata Bridge; there is a wide open space in front where people feed the pigeons.
- Grand Bazaar – as much to look at as to shop in.
- Spice Bazaar – another Ottoman caravanserai, not as huge as the Grand Bazaar but right on the water, next to the Yeni Mosque;
- Sokollu Mehmet Pasha Mosque – in Kadirga District (the Byzantine Sophianòn Limin in Greek).

== Demographics ==
Historical population

Year	Pop.	±% p.a.
1935	172,902	—
1940	160,589	−1.47%
1945	181,025	+2.42%
1950	226,853	+4.62%
1955	286,733	+4.80%
1960	300,594	+0.95%
1965	344,602	+2.77%
1970	417,662	+3.92%
1975	504,127	+3.83%

Year	Pop.	±% p.a.
1980	474,578	−1.20%
1985	497,459	+0.95%
1990	462,464	−1.45%
1997	432,590	−0.95%
2007	422,941	−0.23%
2012	428,857	+0.28%
2017	433,873	+0.23%
2022	368,227	−3.23%

Source: Population censuses (1935–1997) and TÜIK (2007–2022)

== Media ==
The offices of the magazine Servet-i Fünun were in "Stamboul" (what is now Fatih district) during the magazine's existence.

== Pollution ==
Air pollution in Turkey, such as fine dust from traffic, is a serious problem in Istanbul. Although the historic peninsula was partially pedestrianised in the early 21st century, a 2015 study found that this is the part of the city which would benefit most from a low emission zone. However, as of 2022, it was still said to be "car-oriented".

== Visitor attractions ==
Today, there are still remnants of the sea walls along the Golden Horn and along the Marmara shore, to give a sense of the shape of the old walled city. There are also a number of important architectural structures in the Fatih district, including the Valens Aqueduct across the Atatürk Bulvarı, the fortress on the city walls at Yedikule, the Byzantine Palace of the Porphyrogenitus, the Roman column of Marcian, the Fethiye Cami (the former Byzantine church of Christ Pammakaristos), the Kariye Camii (the former Byzantine church of the Chora), Gül Camii (another former Byzantine church), Fenari Isa Camisi (a complex of two Byzantine churches), the Greek Patriarchate with the Church of St. George in the Fener district, the Church of St. Stephen ("The Iron Church"), the Yavuz Selim Camii, the House-Museum of Dimitrie Cantemir, and the Fatih Mosque itself. The tombs of some of the famous Ottoman sultans are in Fatih. These include Mehmed II 'the Conqueror' (Fatih Sultan Mehmed), Selim I (Yavuz Sultan Selim), Suleyman the Magnificent, and Abdul Hamid Khan, as well as other leading statesmen of the Ottoman Empire, including Gazi Osman Pasha. Fatih also has a collection of various cuisines (Syrian, Korean, Indian).

== International relations ==
Fatih is twinned with:

- Wiesbaden, Hesse, Germany

== See also ==
- Üsküdar
- Sultanahmet Square
