= Sokollu Mehmed Pasha Mosque, Kadırga =

16th century Turkish mosque

Sokollu Mehmed Pasha Mosque
- Sokollu Mehmet Paşa Camii
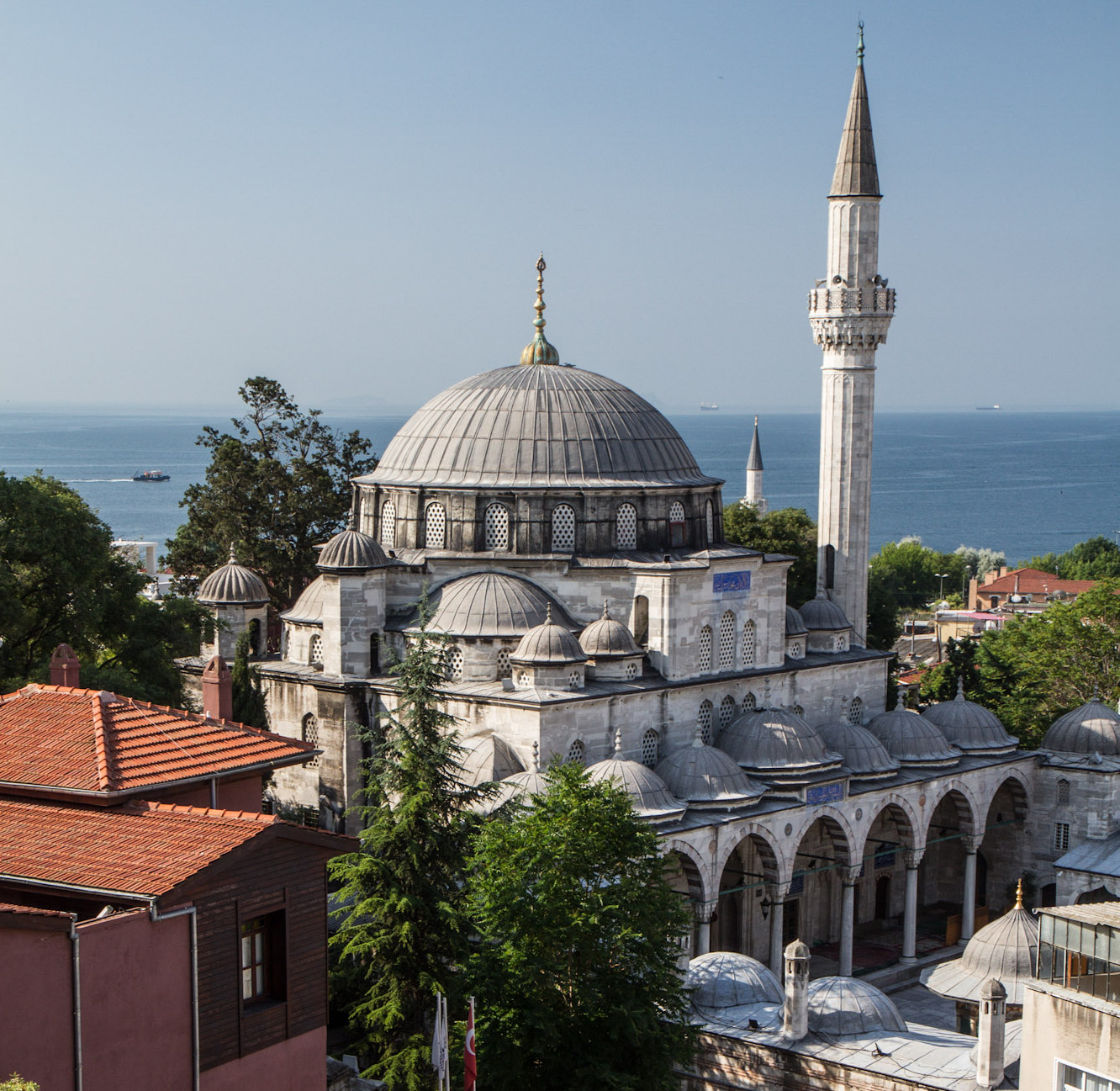
- View of the Sokollu Mehmet Pasha Mosque

- Location within the Fatih district of Istanbul

Religion
- Affiliation: Islam

Location
- Location: Istanbul, Turkey
- Coordinates: 41°00′17″N 28°58′20″E

Architecture
- Architect: Mimar Sinan
- Type: mosque
- Groundbreaking: c. 1568
- Completed: 1571/2

Specifications
- Dome height (outer): 22.8 m (75 ft)
- Dome dia. (outer): 13 m (43 ft)
- Minaret: 1
- Materials: granite, marble

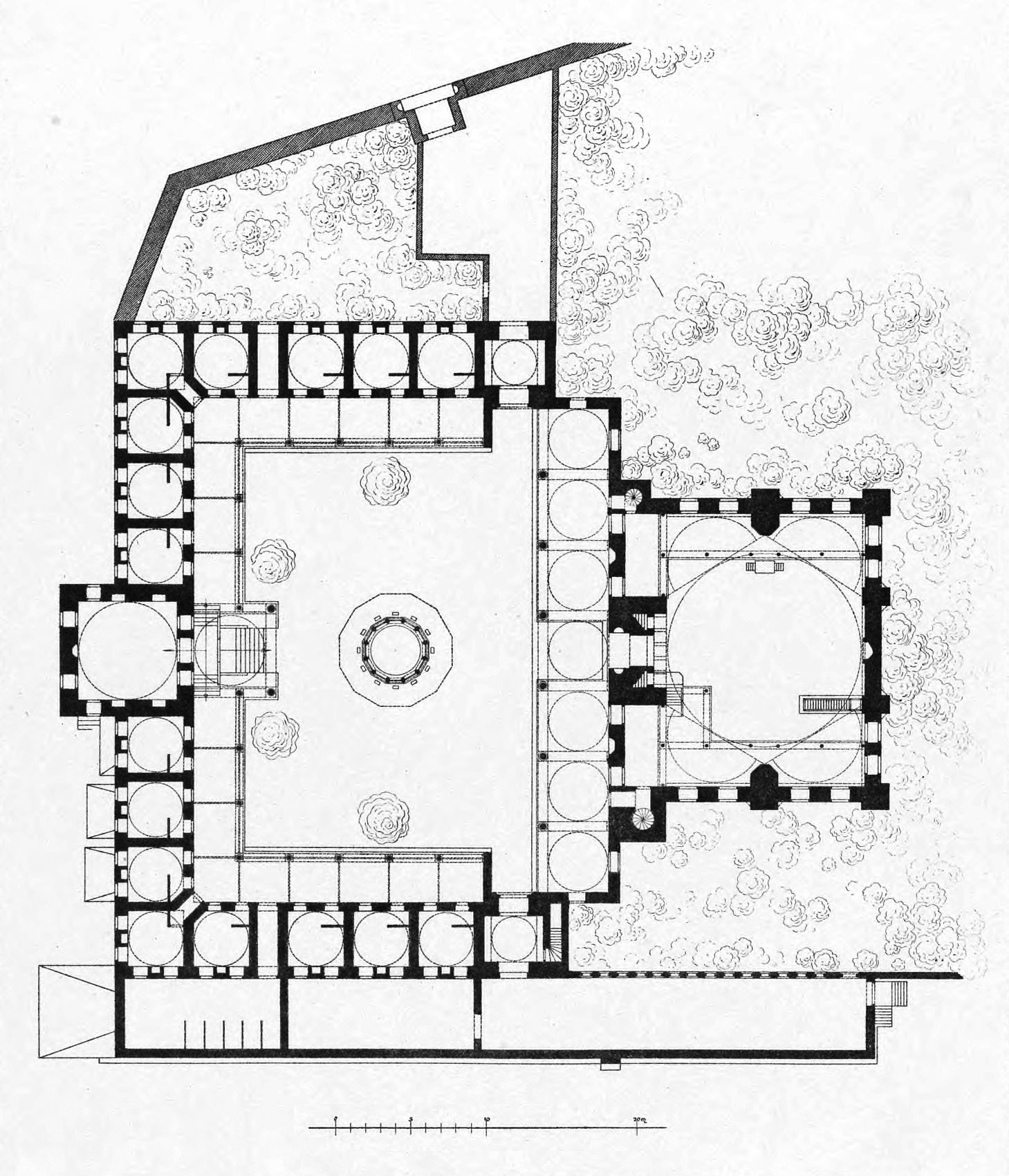
Plan by Cornelius Gurlitt, 1912

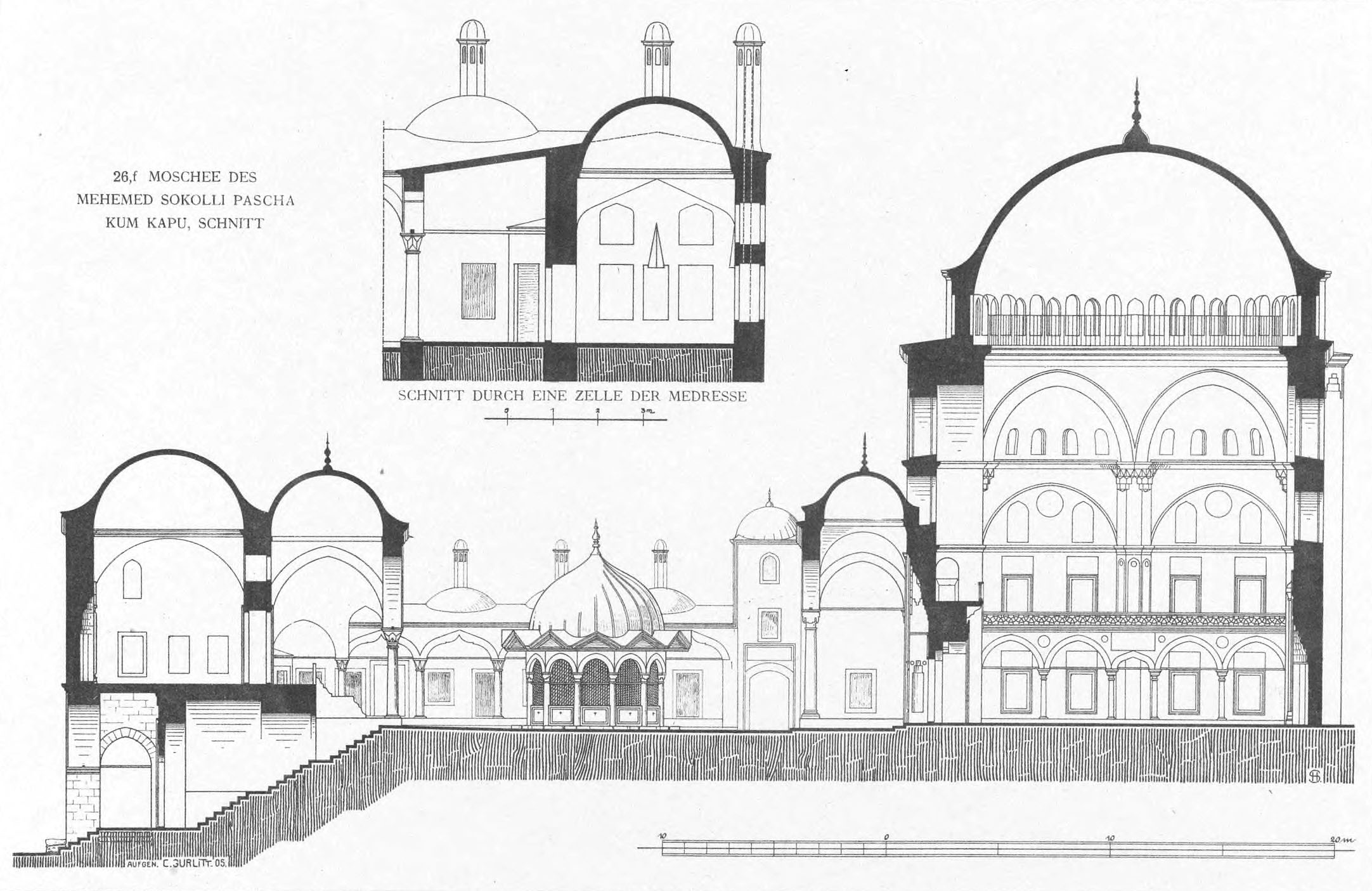
Cross section by Cornelius Gurlitt, 1912

Sokollu Mehmed Pasha Mosque (Turkish: Sokollu Mehmet Paşa Camii) is a 16th-century Ottoman mosque in the Kadırga neighborhood in Fatih district, Istanbul, Turkey. It was commissioned jointly by the grand vizier Sokollu Mehmed Pasha and his wife Ismihan Sultan. It was designed by the imperial architect Mimar Sinan and completed in 1571/2. The mosque is noted for the fine quality of the Iznik tiles that decorate the interior walls.

== History ==
The mosque was designed by Ottoman imperial architect Mimar Sinan for the grand vizier Sokollu Mehmed Pasha and his wife Ismihan Sultan, a daughter of Selim II and one of the granddaughters of Sultan Suleiman the Magnificent. According to the foundation inscription in Turkish above the north entrance to the courtyard, the building was completed in AH 979 (1571/72 CE). Although İsmihan Sultan and her husband jointly endowed the mosque, only Sokollu Mehmed Pasha is listed on the foundation inscription.

== Architecture ==
=== Exterior ===
The mosque is noted for its architecturally challenging location on a steep slope. Sinan resolved this issue by fronting the mosque with a two-storey courtyard. The bottom storey was divided into shops, whose rents were intended to help support the upkeep of the mosque. The upper storey with an open colonnaded courtyard had the spaces between the columns on three sides walled off to form small rooms, each with a small window, fireplace and niche to store bedding, forming the living accommodations for a madrasah. The fourth side of the courtyard is the mosque itself, which is designed as a hexagon inscribed in a rectangle, topped by a dome with four small semi-domes in the corners. The dome is 13 metres (43 ft) in diameter and 22.8 metres (75 ft) high. The ablution fountain in the courtyard has twelve columns supporting an onion shaped dome. The single minaret is placed at the northeast corner of the mosque.

=== Interior ===
The interior of the Sokollu Mehmed Pasha Mosque is famous for the İznik tiles, decorated with a wide variety of blue, red and green floral designs, with panels of calligraphy in white thuluth letters on a blue ground. The interior columns make use of polychrome marble. The minbar is made of white marble with a conical cap, sheathed in Iznik tiles. The windows above the mihrab have stained glass. Above the main entrance, framed by a gilded brass bezel, is a fragment of the Kaaba in Mecca; other fragments of this black stone are above the minbar and mihrab. As well as the tilework, parts of the mosque were originally painted. Most of the paintwork has been renovated but some of the original paintwork survives above the vestibule of the north entrance, on the brackets supporting the balcony above the entrance, and under the ceilings of the side galleries.

== Gallery ==
Views of the mosque
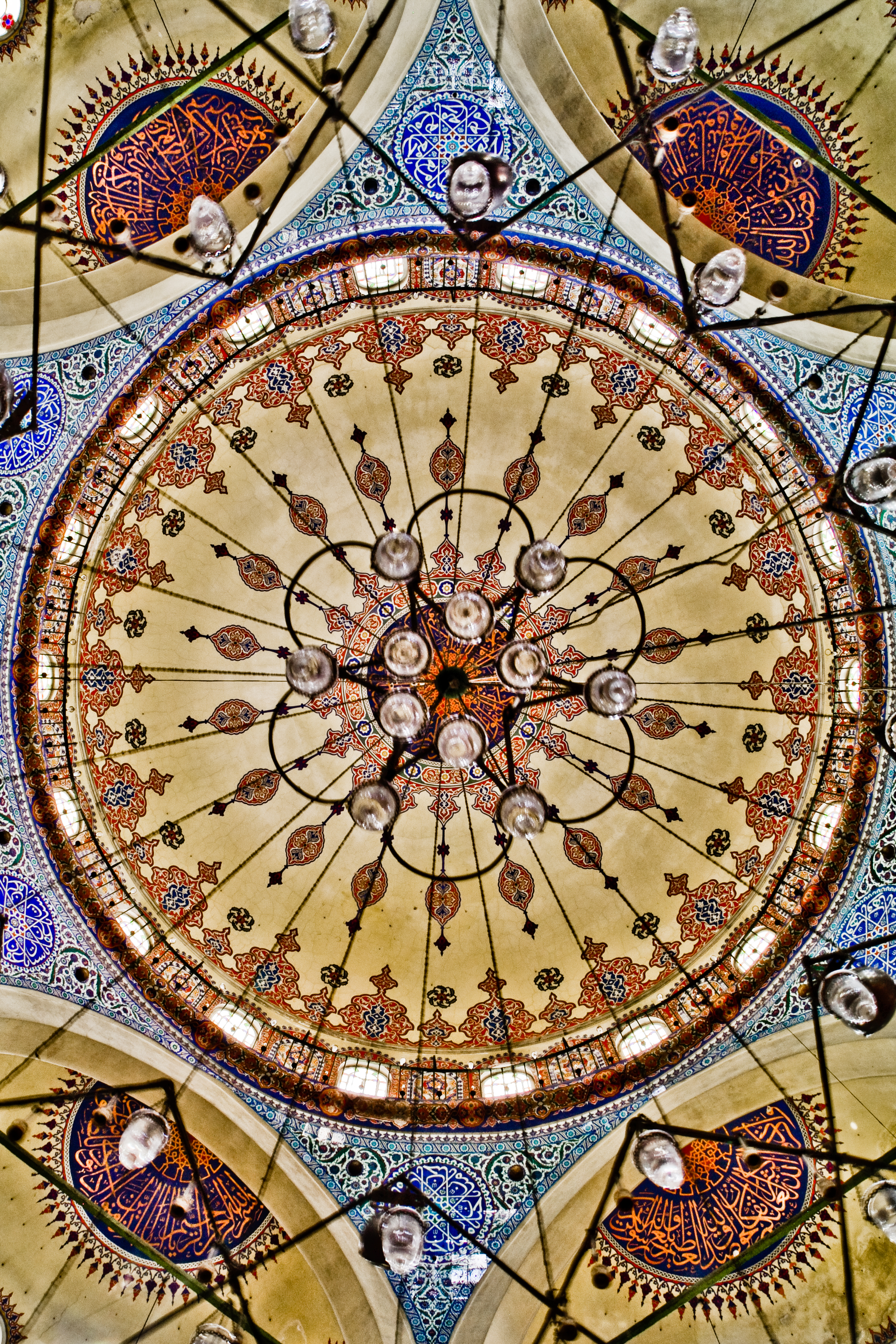
Dome View

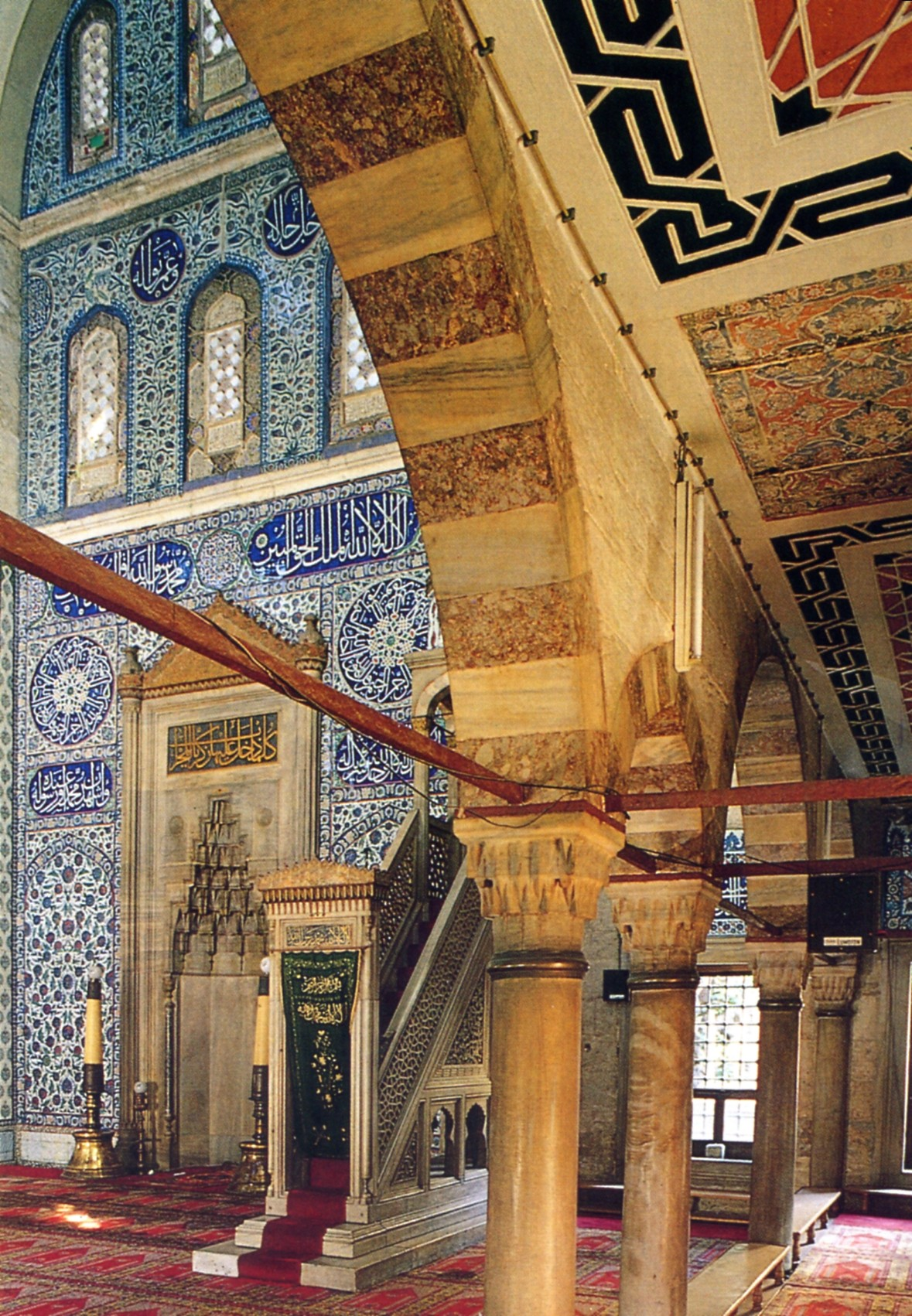
Interior view

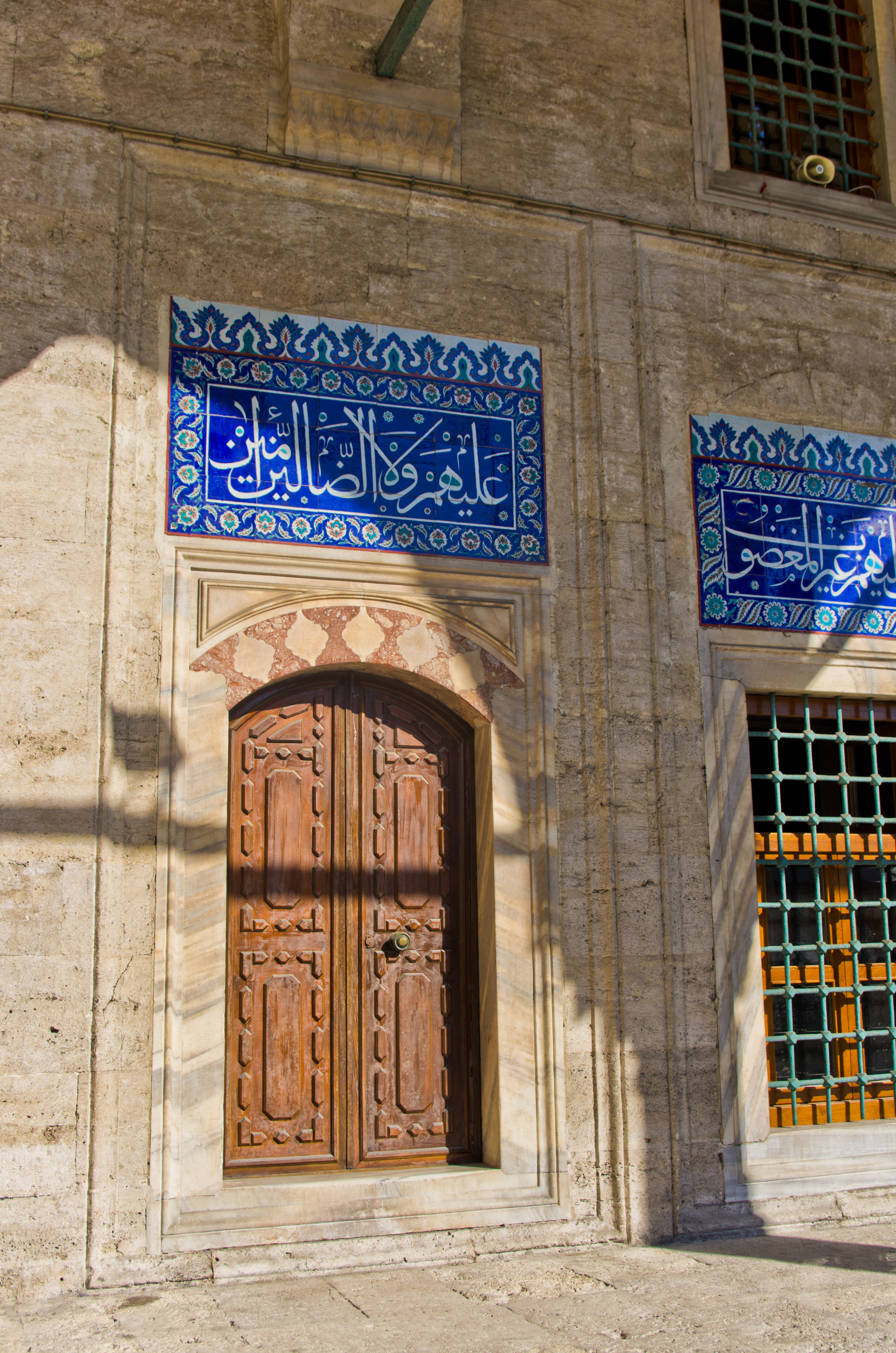
Detail

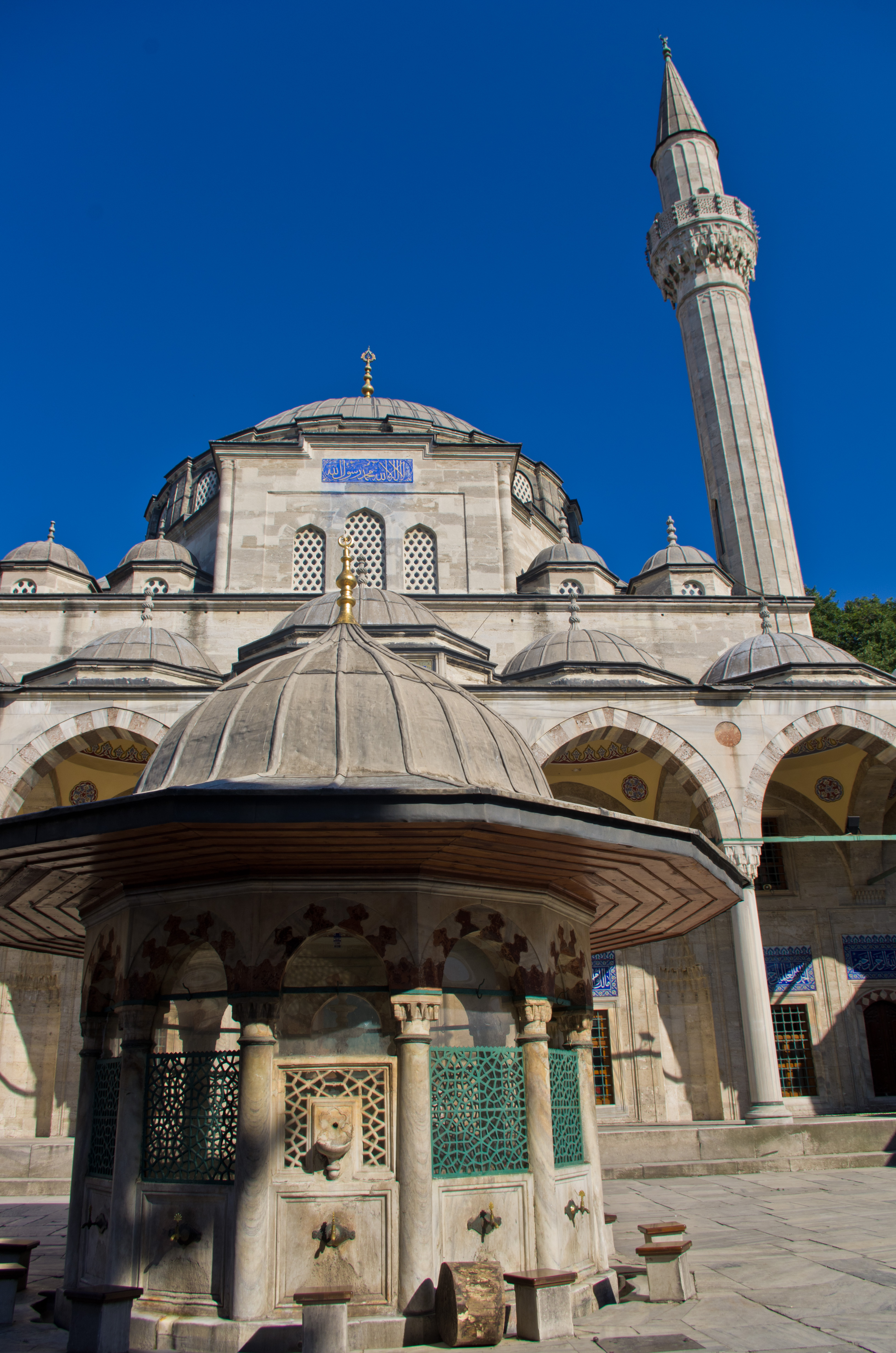
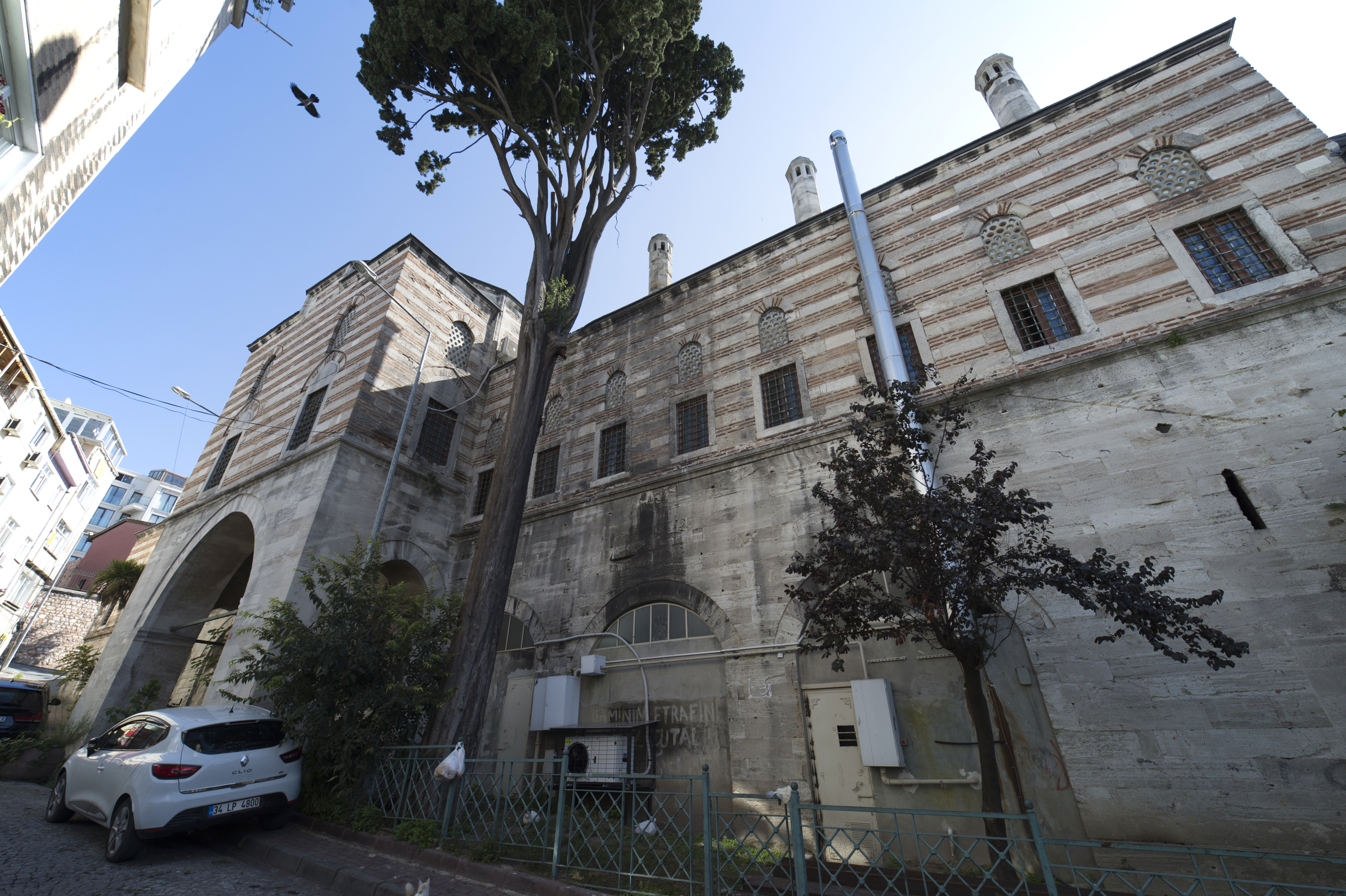
Front

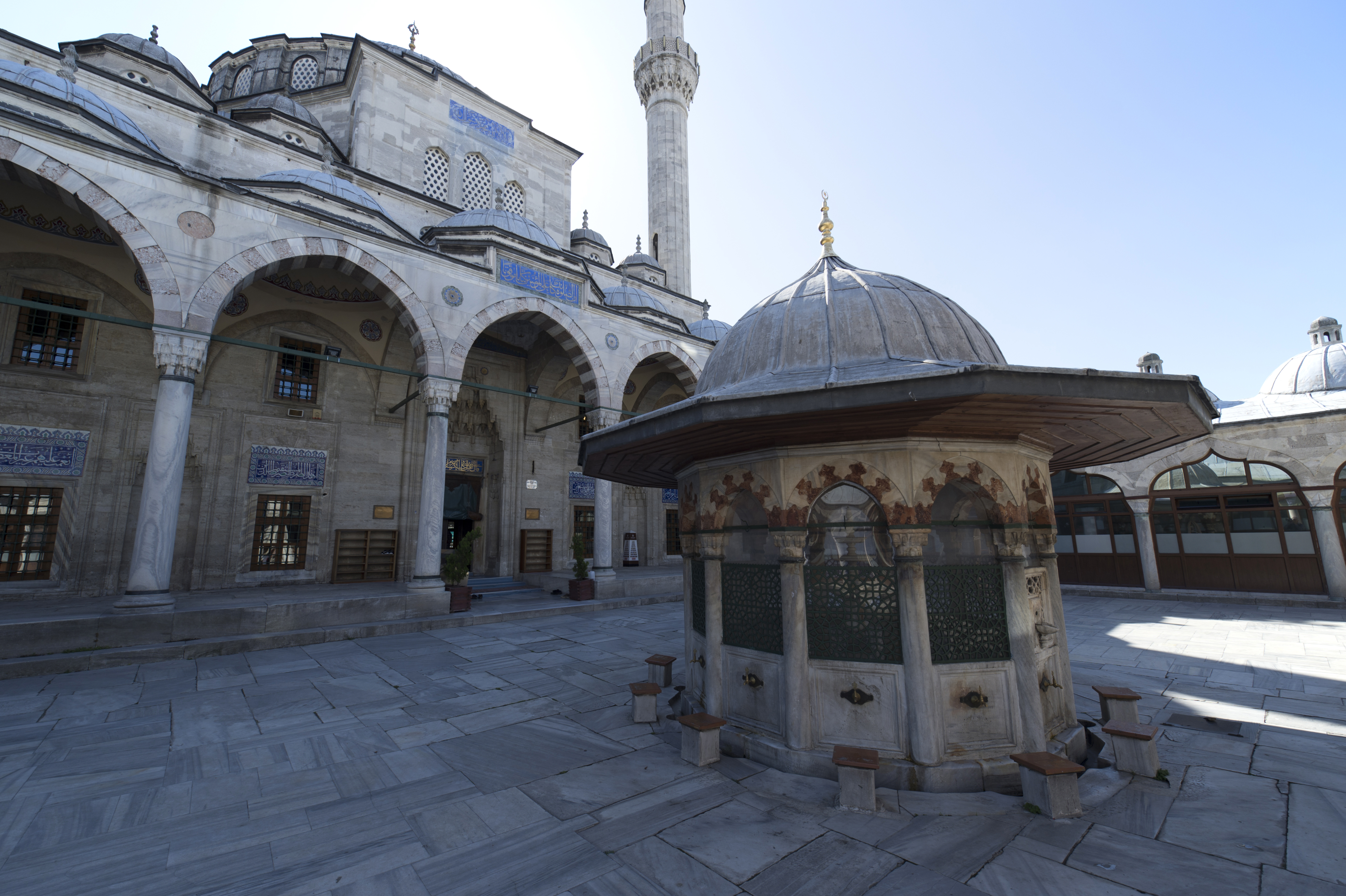
Courtyard

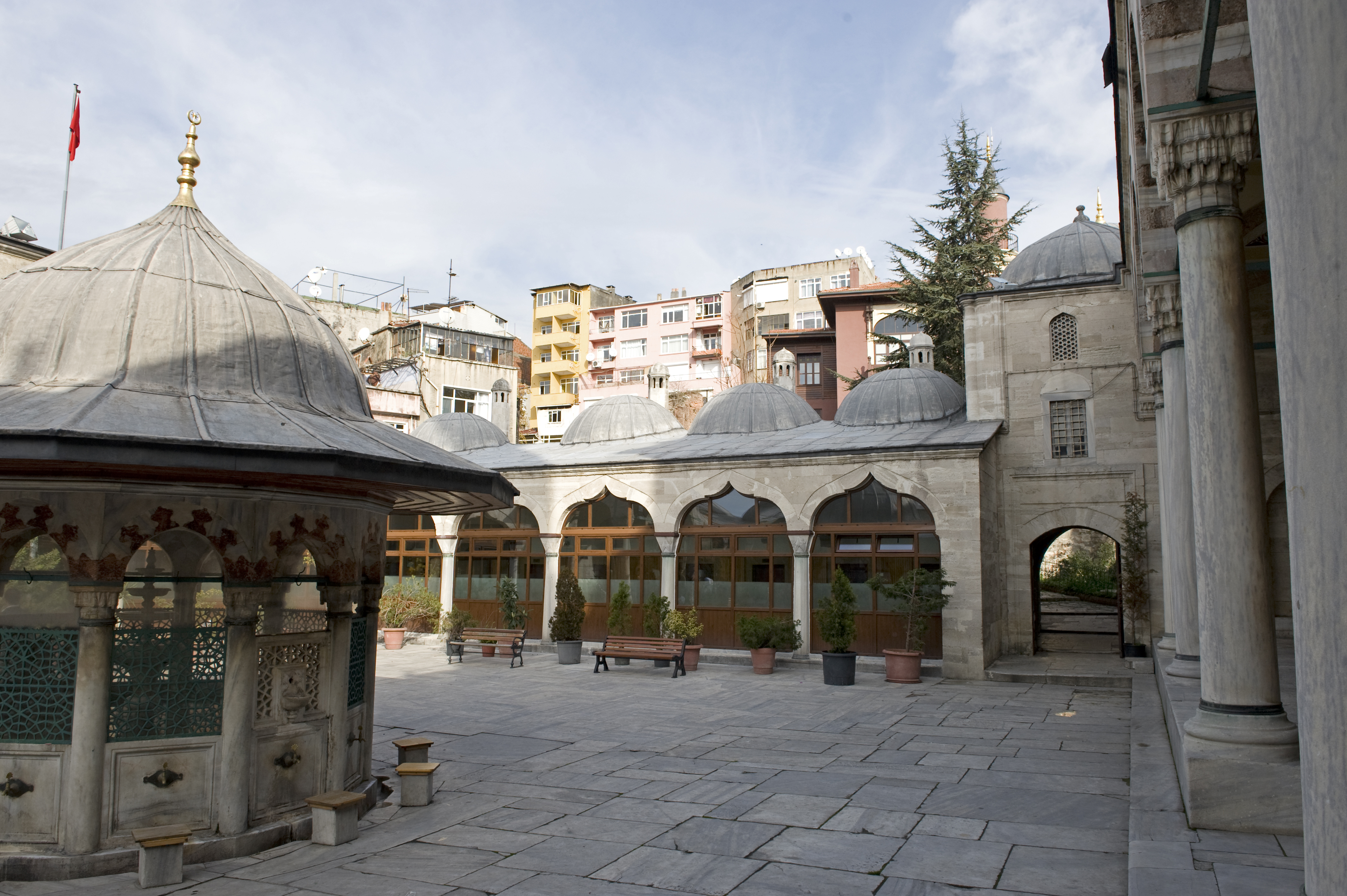
Courtyard

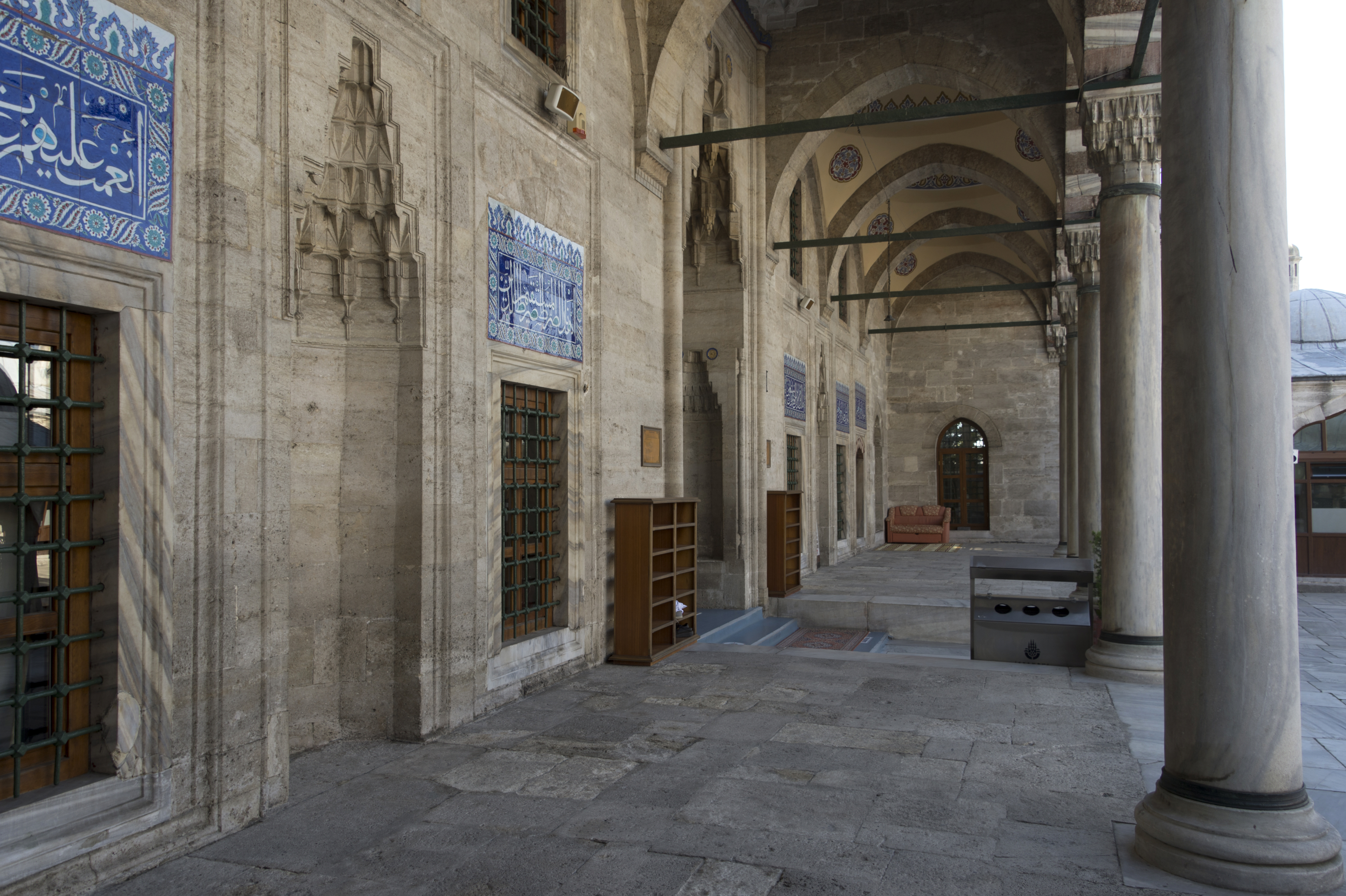
Portico

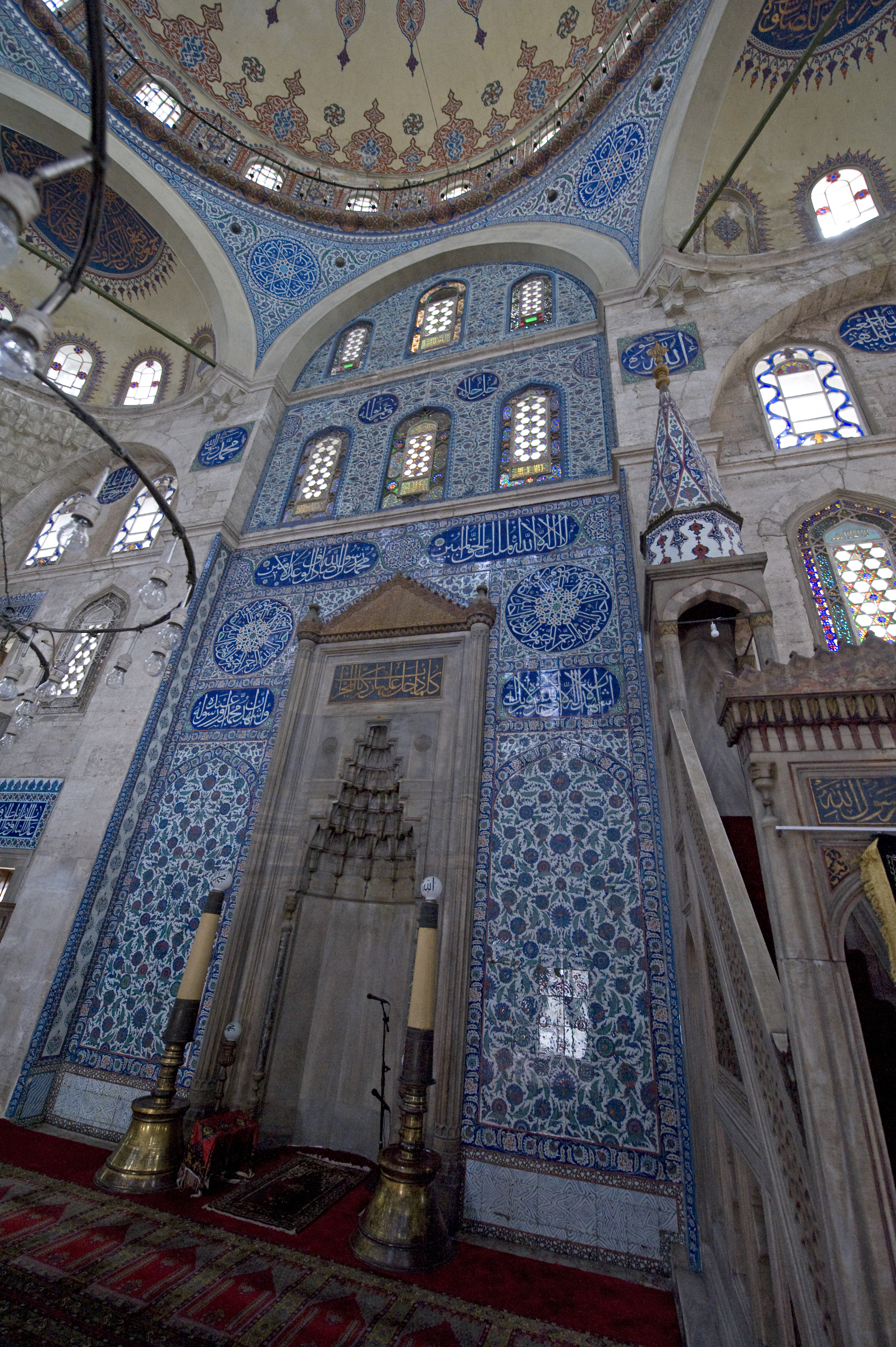
Mihrab and minber

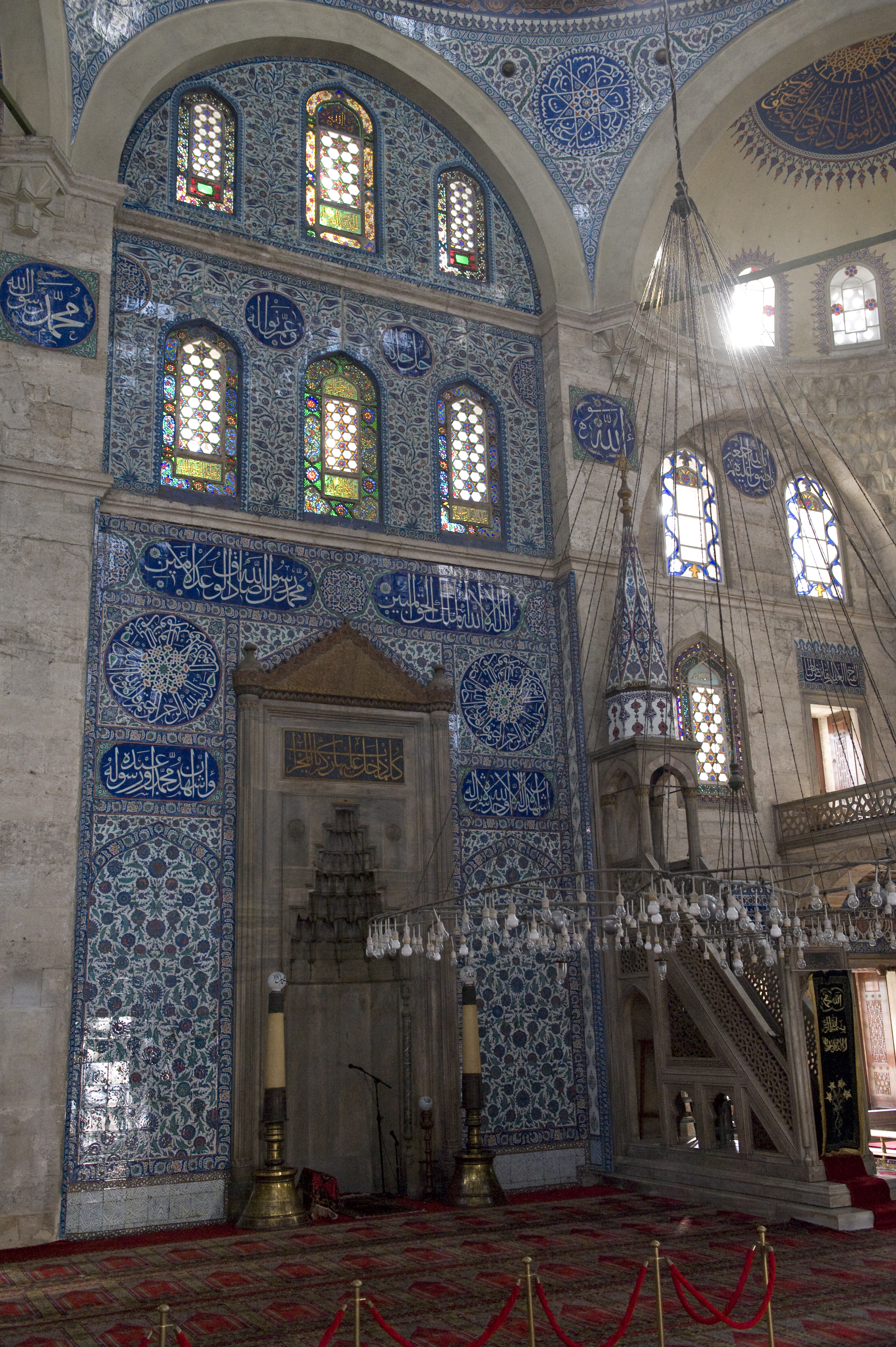
Mihrab and minber

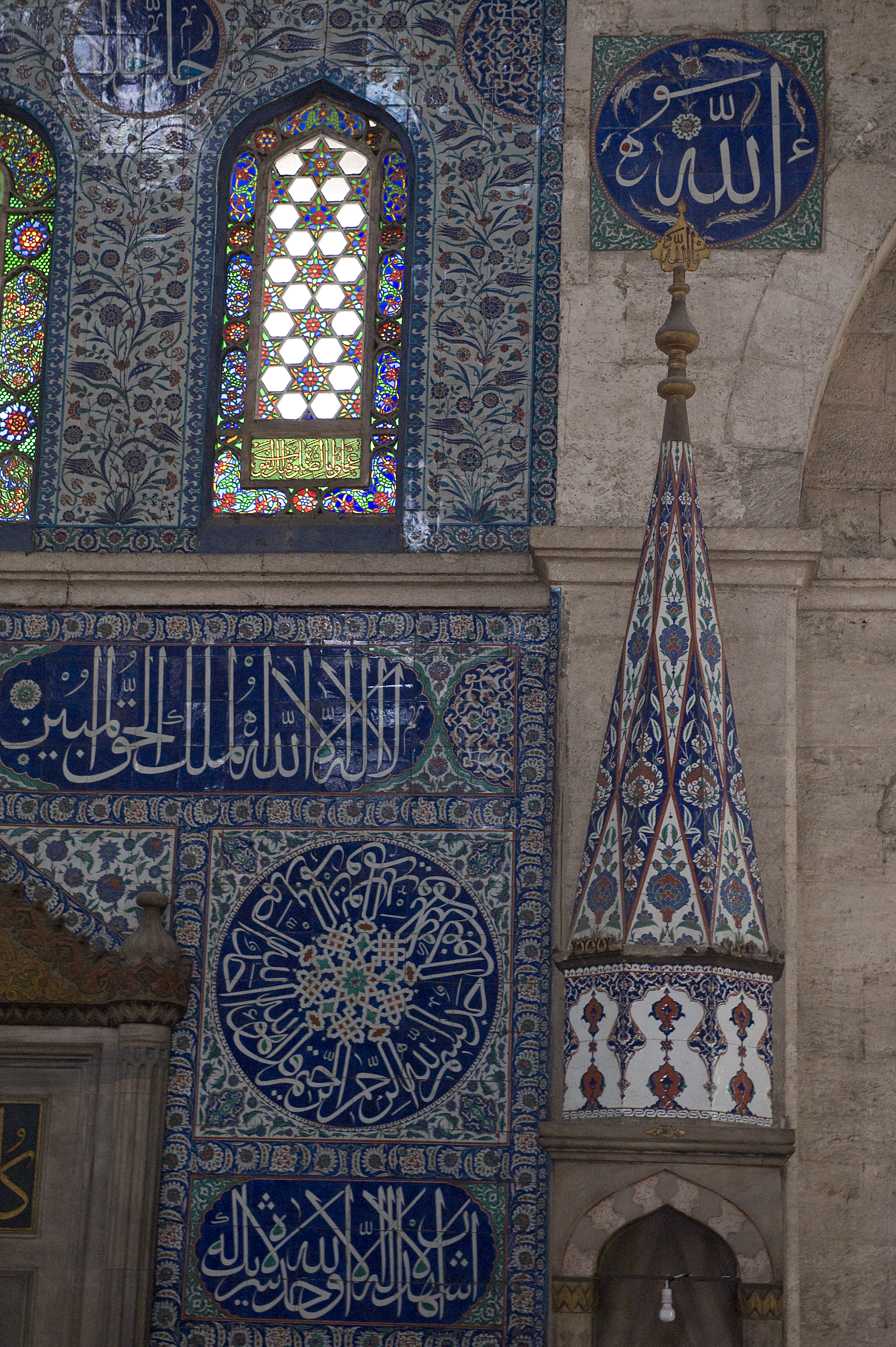
Mihrab and minber detail

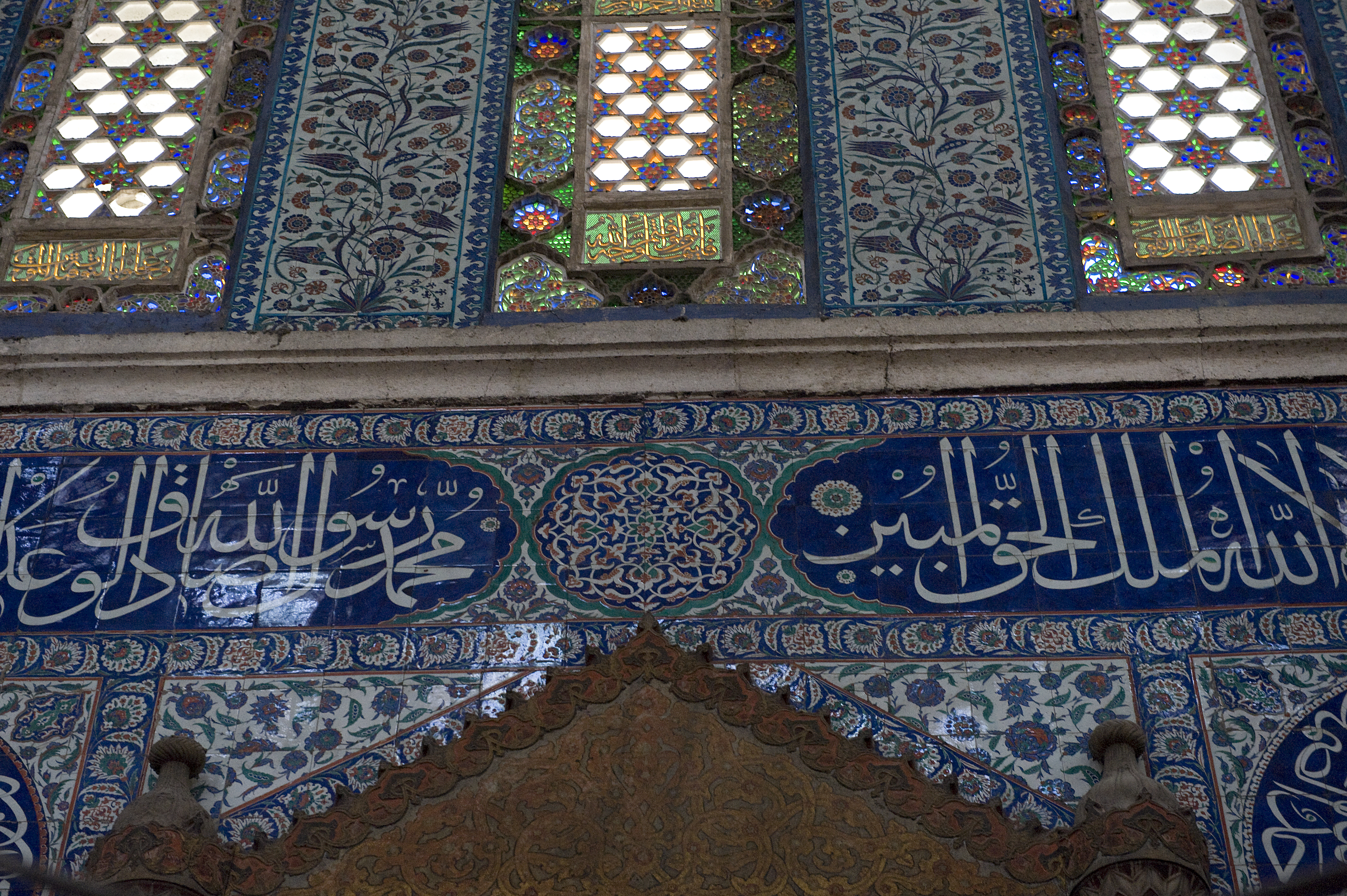
Calligraphic tiles

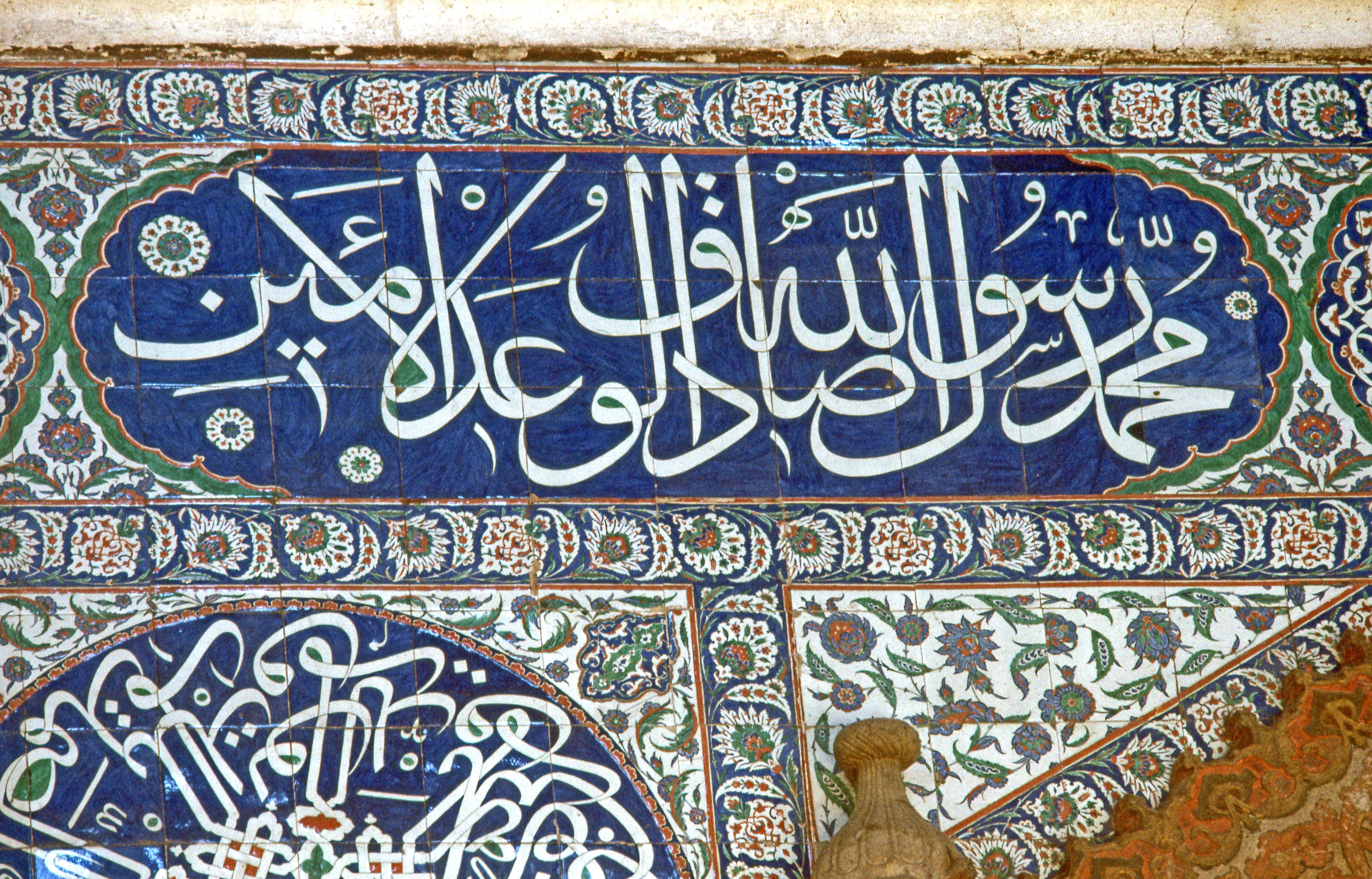
Calligraphic tiles

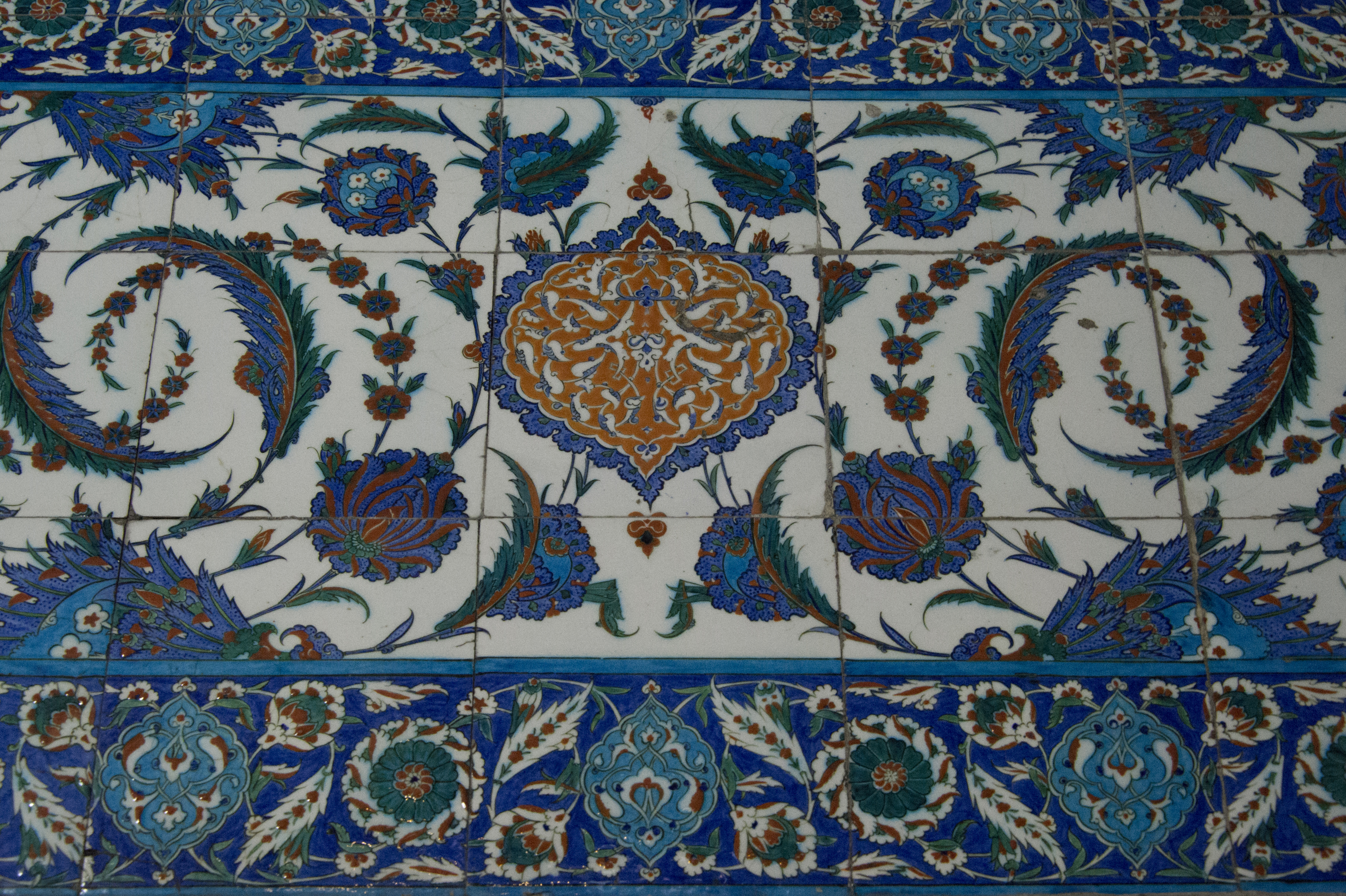
Iznik tiles

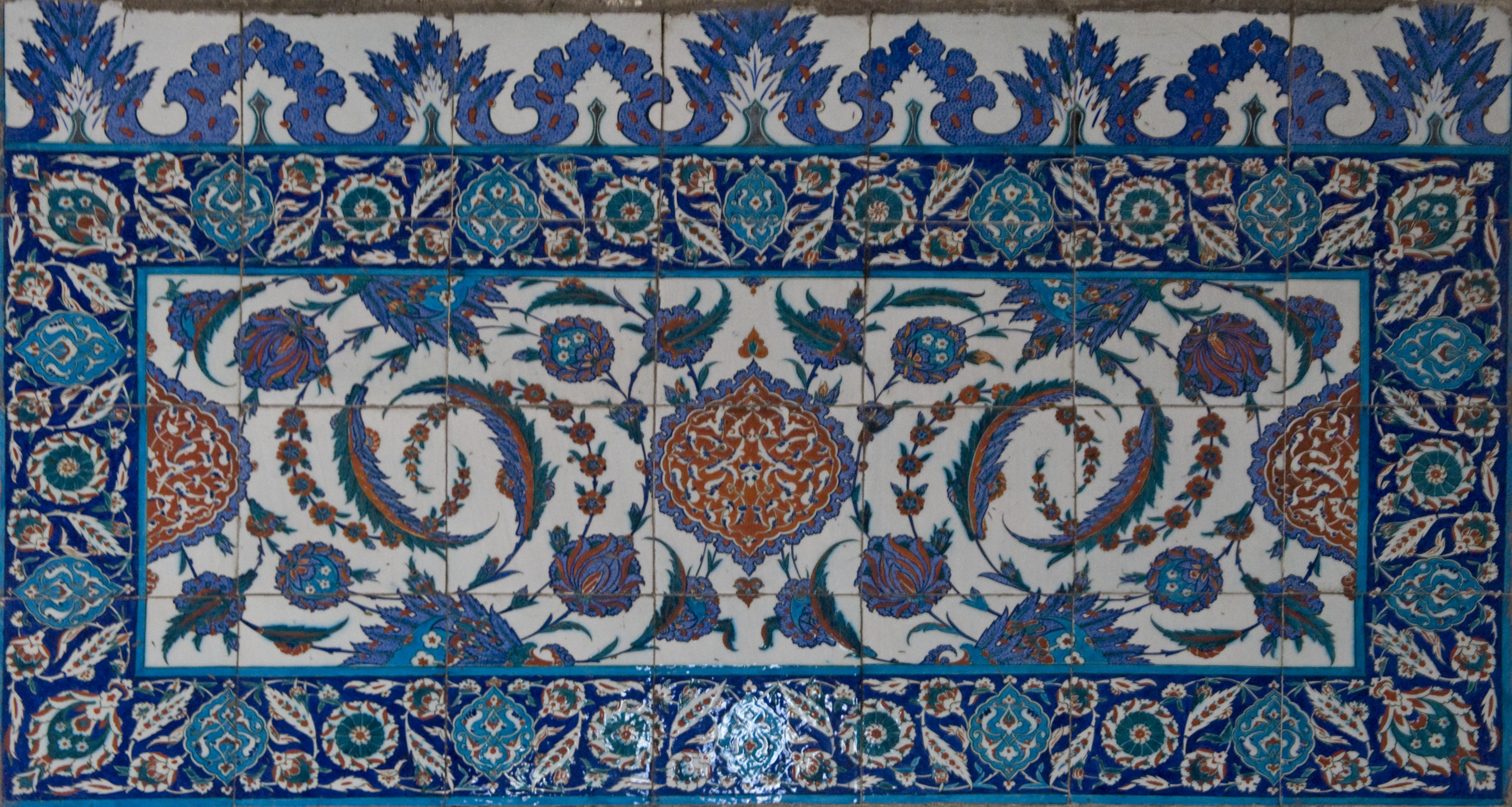
Iznik tiles

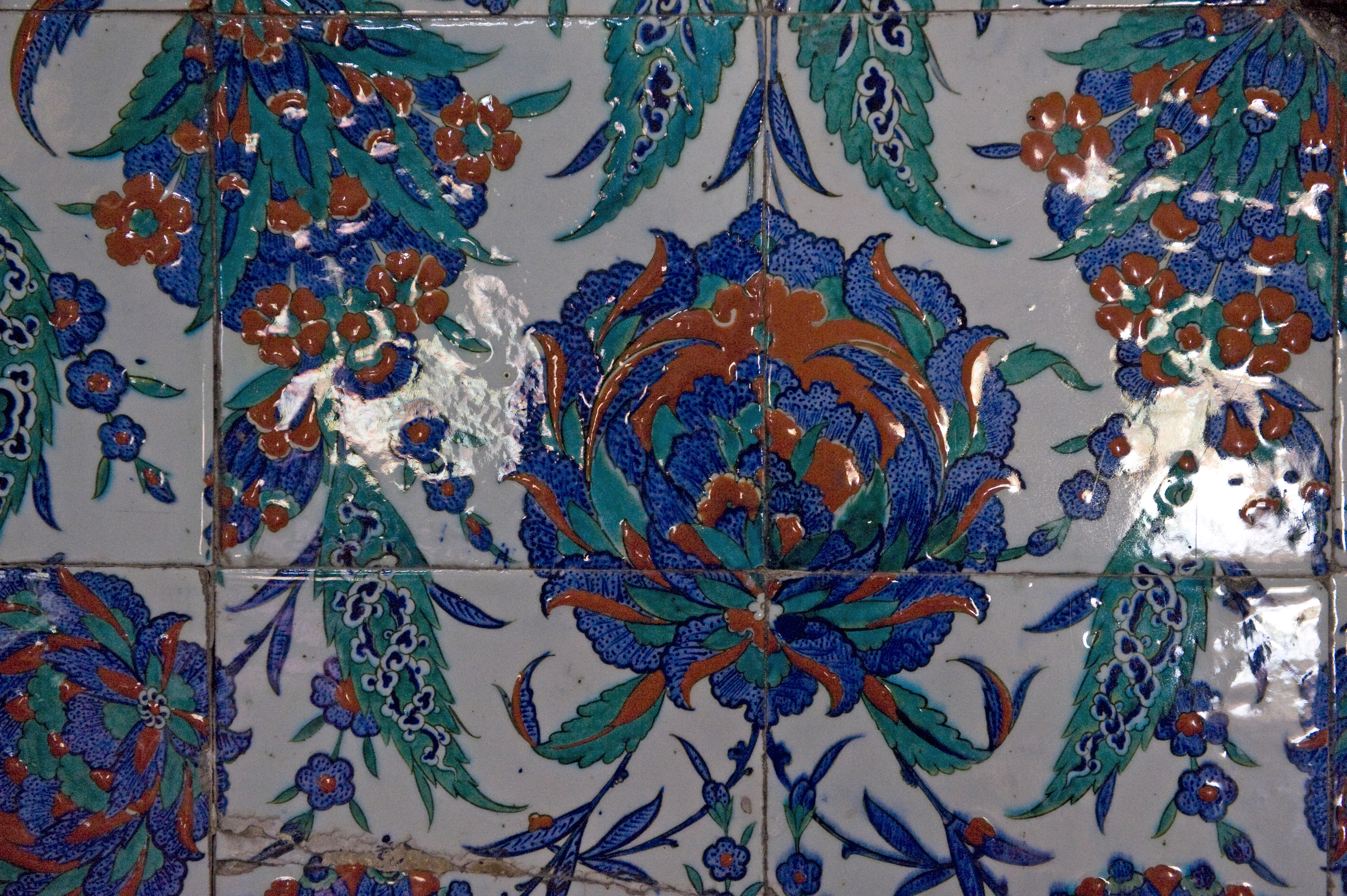
Iznik tiles

== See also ==
- List of Friday mosques designed by Mimar Sinan

== Sources ==
- Denny, Walter B. (2004). Iznik: The Artistry of Ottoman Ceramics. London: Thames & Hudson. ISBN 978-0-500-51192-3.
- Goodwin, Godfrey (2003) [1971]. A History of Ottoman Architecture. London: Thames & Hudson. ISBN 978-0-500-27429-3.
- Necipoğlu, Gülru (2005). The Age of Sinan: Architectural Culture in the Ottoman Empire. London: Reaktion Books. ISBN 978-1-86189-253-9.
