= İskenderpaşa =

District in Istanbul, Turkey

- Neighbourhood
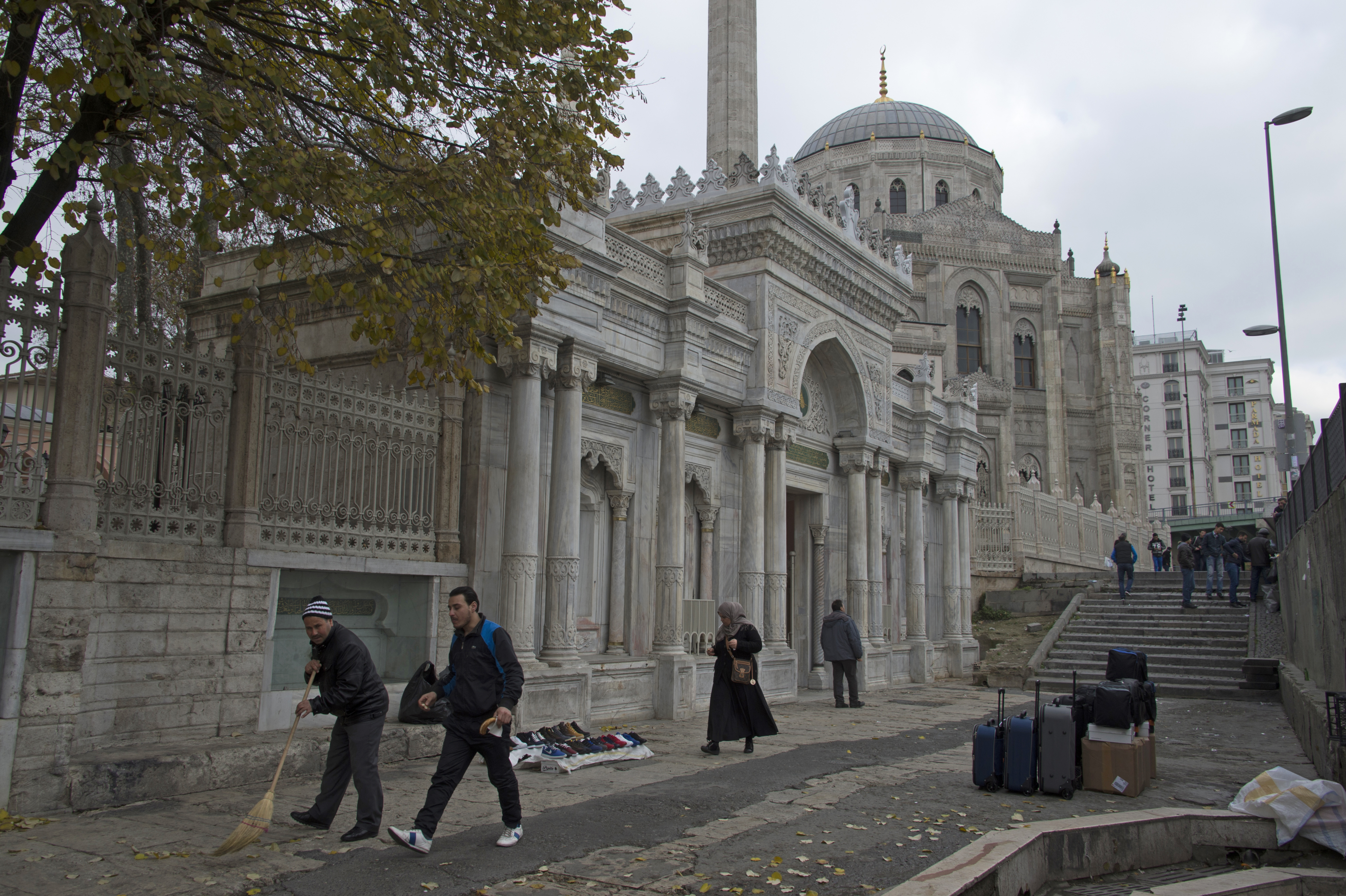
- Pertevniyal Valide Sultan Mosque

- Location within Turkey Location within Istanbul
- Coordinates: 41°0′52″N 28°56′56″E
- Country: Turkey
- Province: Istanbul
- District: Fatih
- Population (2022): 12,024
- Time zone: UTC+3 (TRT)

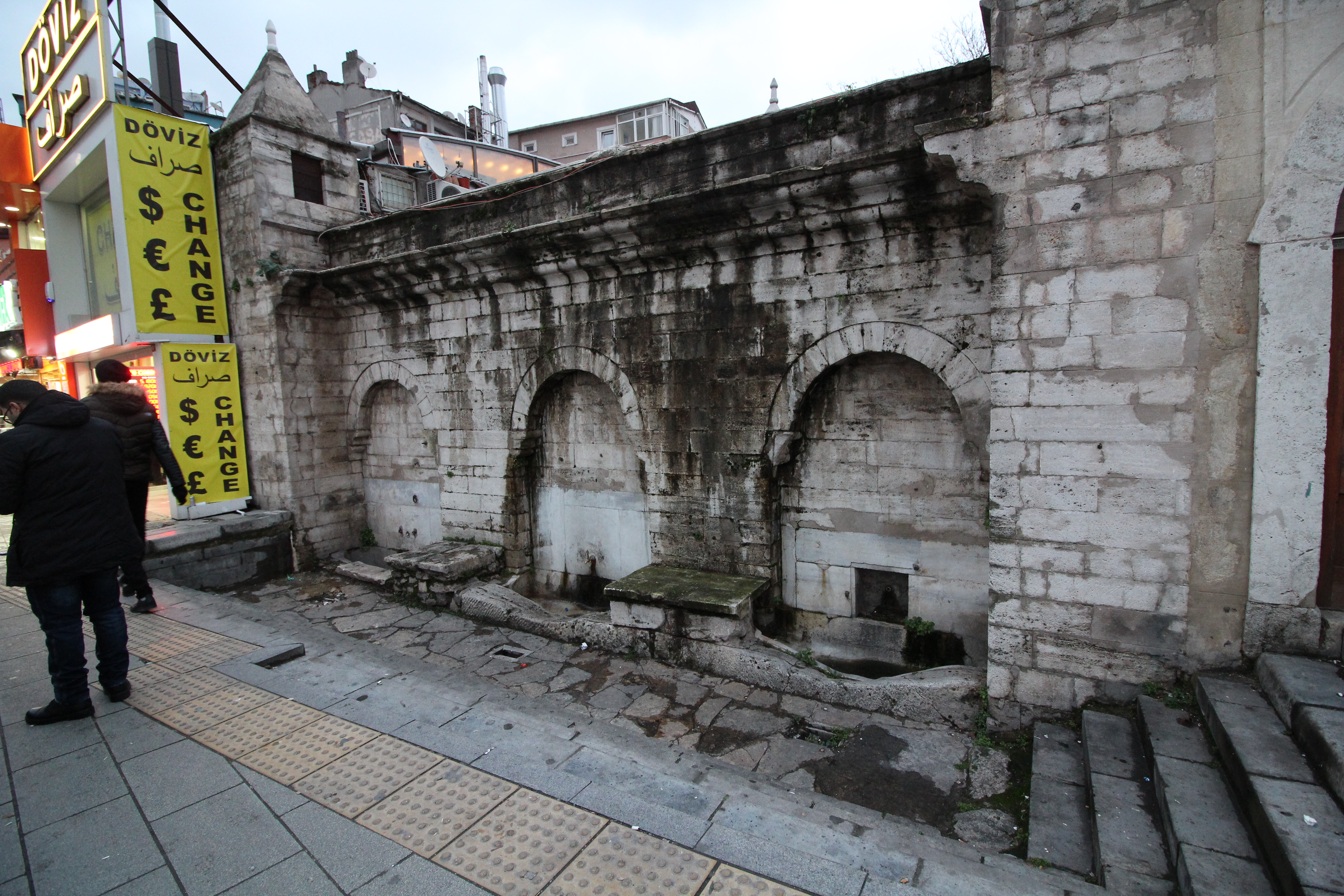
Horhor Fountain

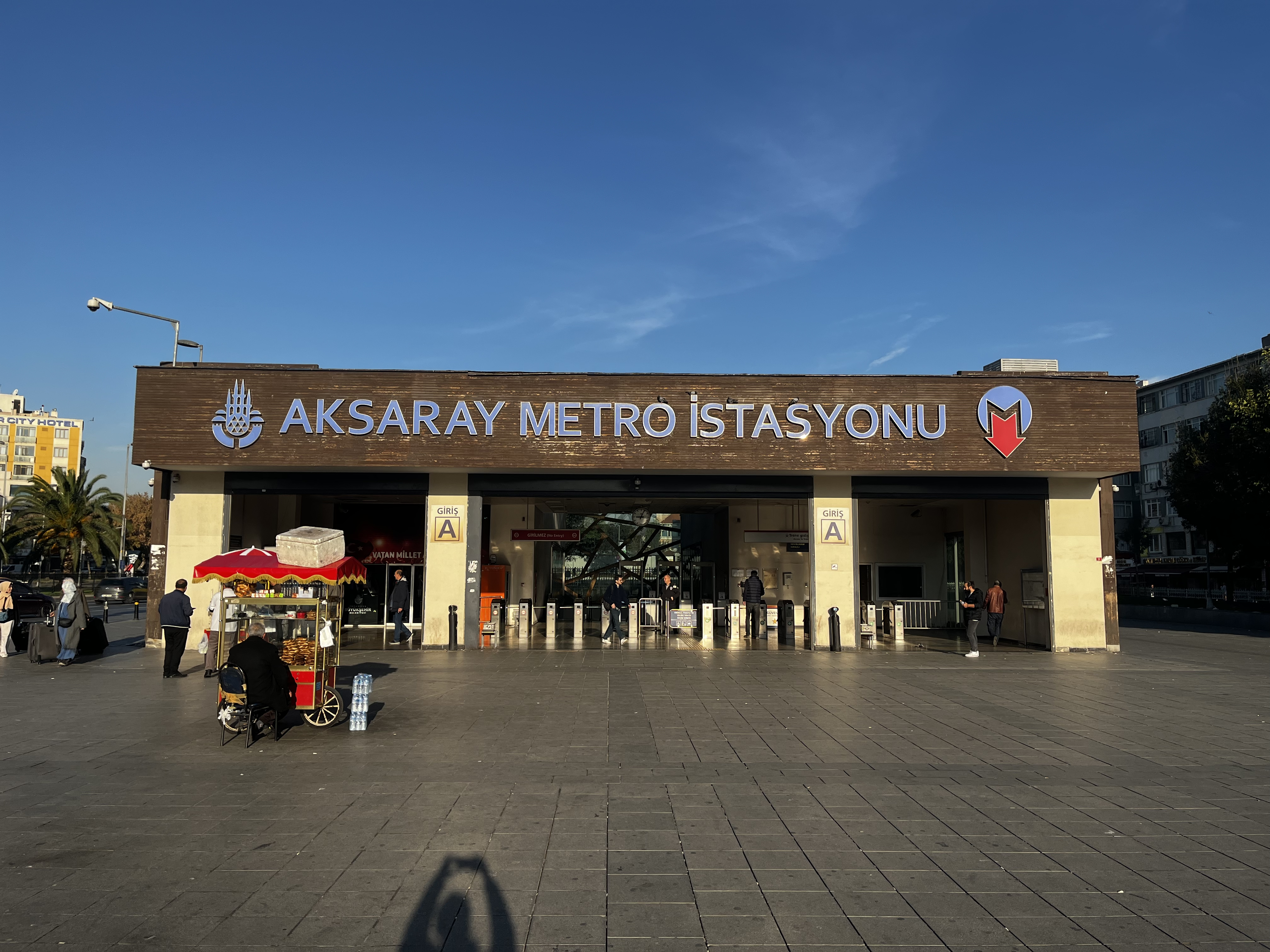
Aksaray Metro Station

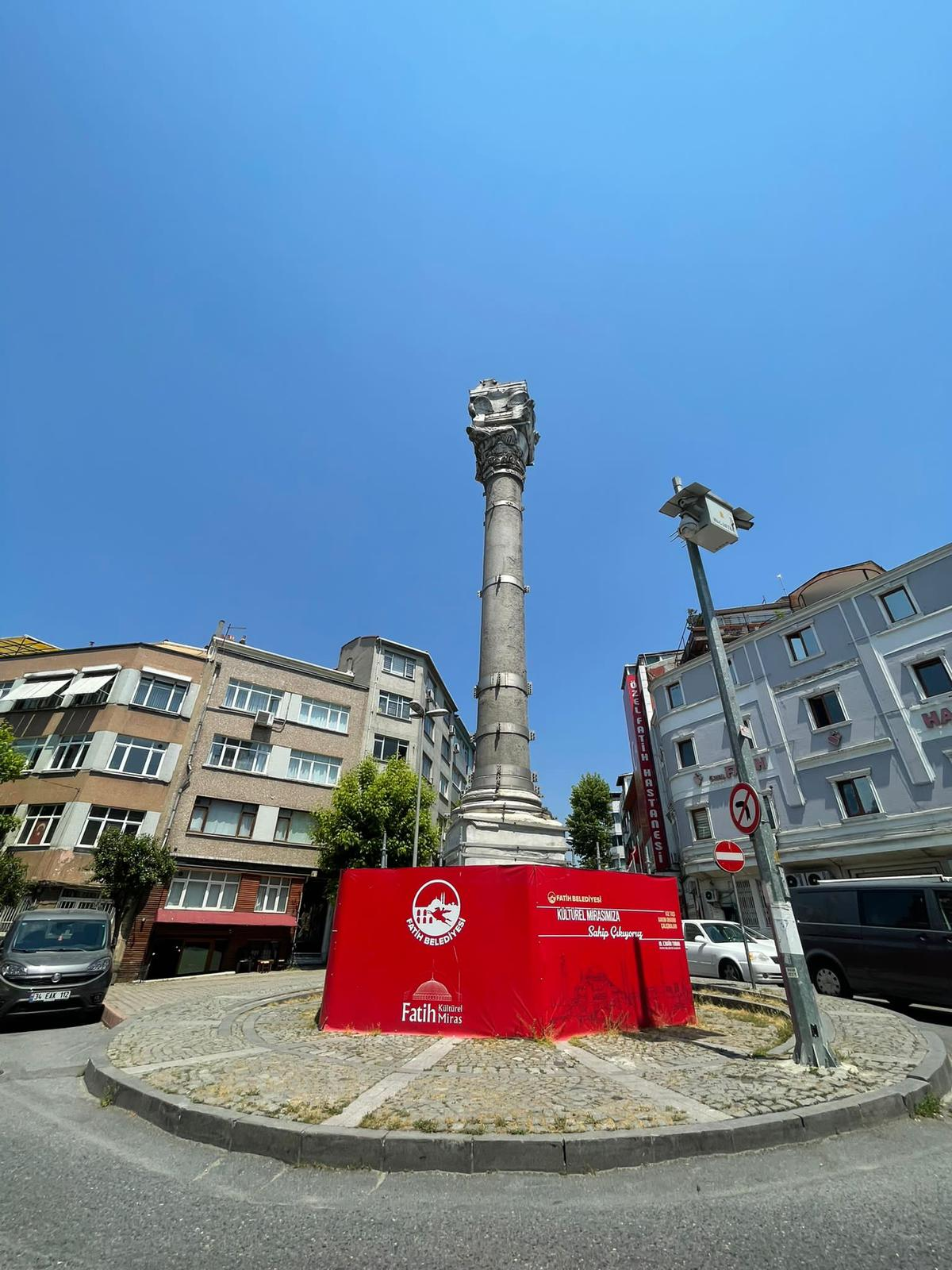
Kıztaşı

İskenderpaşa is a neighbourhood in the municipality and district of Fatih, Istanbul Province, Turkey. Its population is 12,024 (2022). It is in the European part of Istanbul. It is considered one of the most visited areas of Istanbul, as it is located near the shopping center of the city.

== Sites ==
- Historia Shopping and Life Center: an indoor shopping center with a fountain, a variety of shops, restaurants, a cinema and a food court.
- Kıztaşı(Maidenstone): located in the middle of a small square in Fatih district, the structure consists of an 8.75 m high column erected in two pieces of red-gray Egyptian marble brought from Aswan (Syene) and a 2.35 m high quadrilateral pedestal.
- Pertevniyal Valide Sultan Mosque: a grand Ottoman imperial mosque built by Pertevniyal Valide Sultan, the wife of Sultan Mahmut II and the mother of Sultan Abdulaziz.
- Saraçhane Archaeological Park: the artifacts displayed in the Sarachkhane Archaeological Park were discovered during the excavation of a new boulevard, the construction of which began on the orders of the then Prime Minister Adnan Menderes in the late 1950s.

=== Metro ===
Aksaray Metro Station is an underground metro station located on Adnan Menderes Boulevard (Vatan Caddesi) in the İskenderpaşa district of Fatih. It commissioned on September 3, 1989. The station is one of the first modern metro stations in Istanbul.

Metro station is located on the M1A (Yenikapi — Ataturk Airport) and M1B (Yenikapi — Kirazli) lines of the Istanbul Metro.
