= Saraç İshak, Fatih =

Neighborhood in Istanbul

Saraç İshak is a neighborhood in the Fatih District of Istanbul, Turkey. Its population is 798 (2025).

The neighborhood is located between Beyazıt and Kumkapı in the historical peninsula of Istanbul on a slope overlooking the Sea of Marmara. The neighborhood is bordered on the north by the Mimar Kemalettin neighborhood, on the east by the Mimar Hayrettin neighborhood, on the south by the Muhsine Hatun neighborhood, and on the west by the Nişanca neighborhood.

== Name ==
Saraç İshak means literally "Isaac the Saddler" (Turkish: saraç, "saddler," + İshak, "Isaac"). The neighborhood name comes from the local Saraç İshak Mosque, built by Saraç İshak Çelebi (İshak bin Abdullah) around 1488.

In 1546, the neighborhood name was recorded as Mahalle-i Mescid-i Hacı İshak’üs Sarrac (Neighborhood of the Mescit of Hajji İshak the Saddler).
