= Mollafenari, Fatih =

Mollafenari
- Neighbourhood
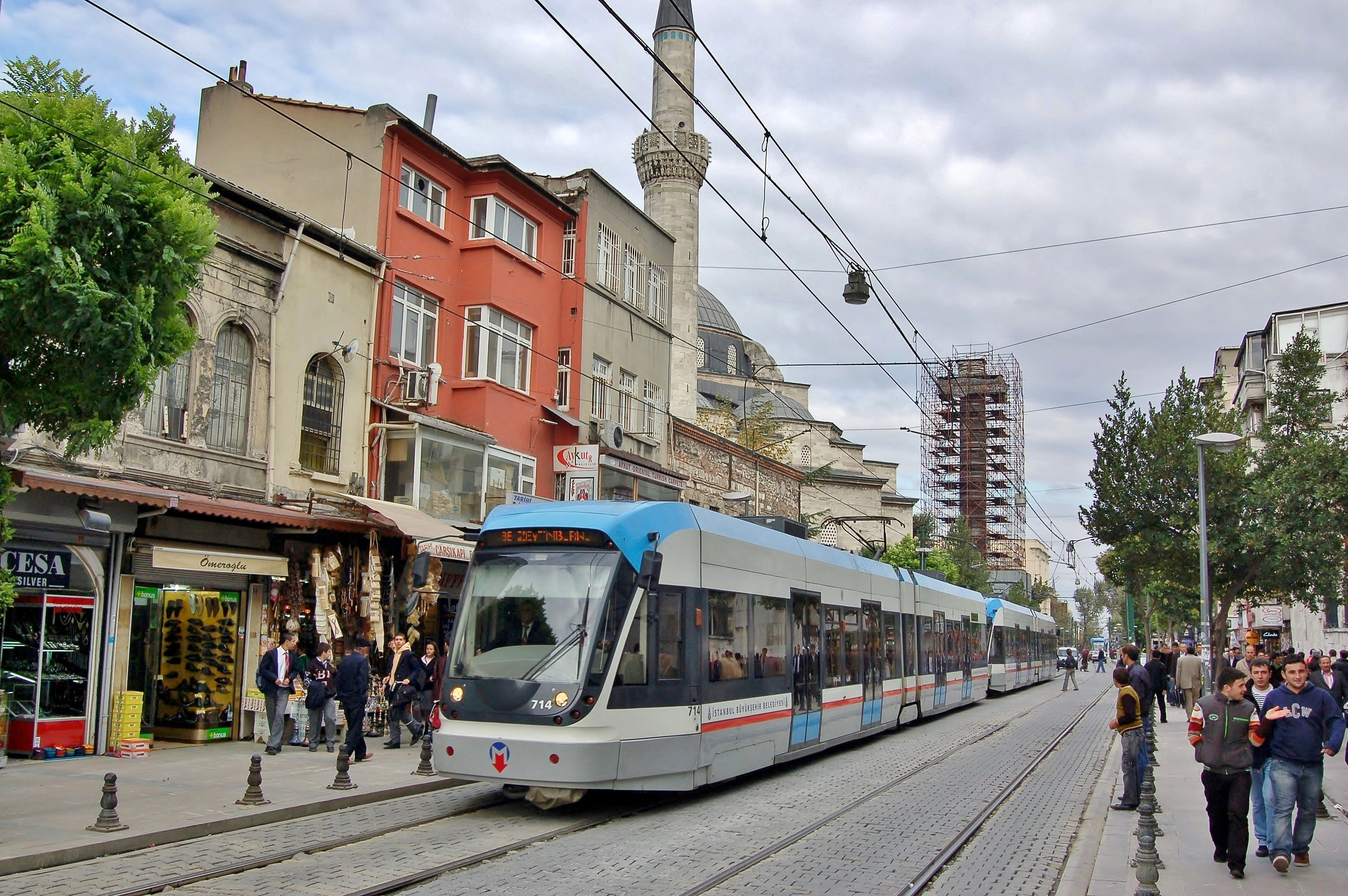
- Çemberlitaş Tramway Station

- Location within Turkey Location within Istanbul
- Coordinates: 41°00′36″N 28°58′16″E
- Country: Turkey
- Province: Istanbul
- District: Fatih
- Population (2022): 99
- Time zone: UTC+3 (TRT)

Mollafenari is a neighbourhood in the municipality and district of Fatih, Istanbul Province, Turkey. Its population is 99 (2022). It is on the European side of Istanbul. Located in the trade center of Istanbul, there are many cafes, coffee shops, stores and mosques.

It has access to T1 Kabatas-Bagcilar Tram Line at the Çemberlitaş Tramway Station.

== History of name ==
Mollafenari was named after the first Sheikh al-Islam of the Ottoman Empire: Shams al-Din al-Fanari (Mullah Fenari).

== Places in Mollafenari ==
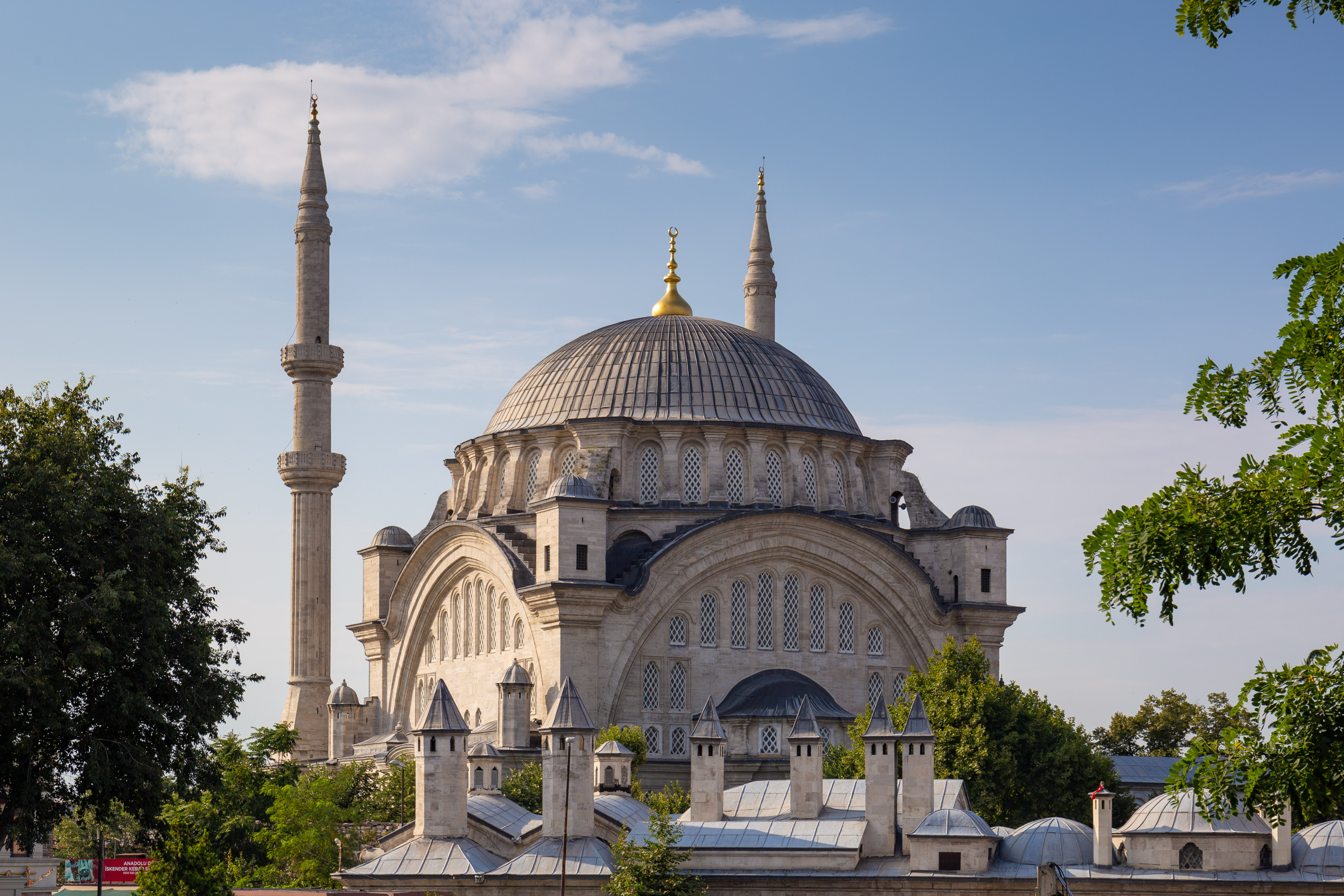
Nuruosmaniye Mosque

Nuruosmaniye Mosque: is an 18th-century Ottoman mosque in Istanbul, Turkey. It is the fourth largest mosque in Istanbul.

Vezir Inn (Vezir Hanı): it is an inn located in the Çemberlitaş, Fatih district of Istanbul Province and gives its name to the street where it is located. In the inscription of the inn dated 1659–60, it is written that it was built by Fazil Ahmet Pasha to be included in the Köprülü Complex.

Column of Constantine: Roman triumphal column located on Çemberlitaş Square in Istanbul, Turkey. It was installed in 328 AD at the Forum of Constantine and inaugurated on the day of the foundation of Constantinople in 330 AD.
