= List of Friday mosques designed by Mimar Sinan =

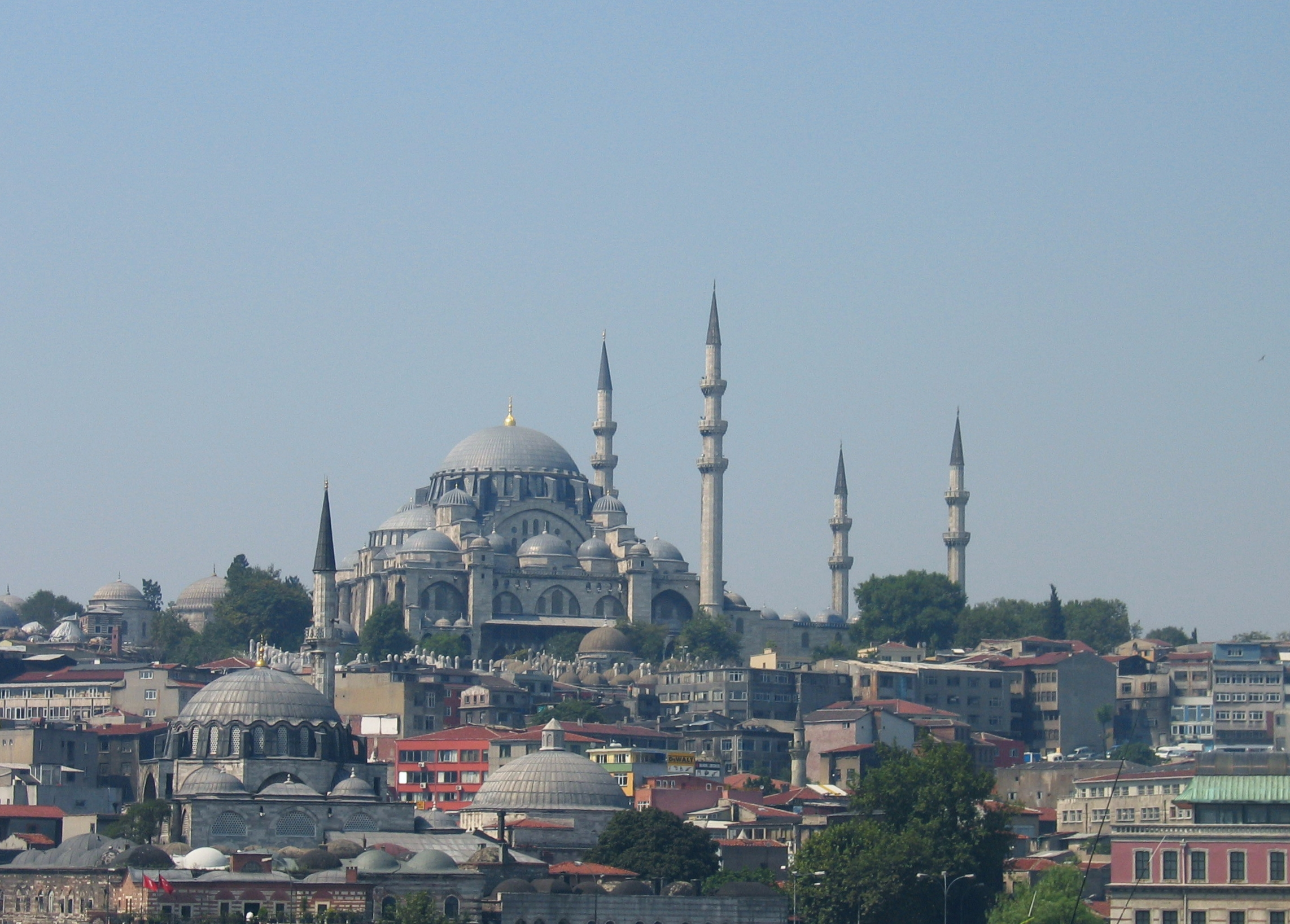
Süleymaniye Mosque which Mimar Sinan considered his most important work

This is a list of the Friday mosques for which the Ottoman architect Mimar Sinan claimed responsibility in his autobiographies. Of the 77 mosques in the list, 39 are in Istanbul.

== Background ==
Mimar Sinan was appointed to the post of chief Ottoman architect by the grand vizier Ayas Mehmed Pasha in 1539. Sinan occupied the position until his death in 1588 and served under three sultans: Süleyman I (ruled 1520–66), Selim II (ruled 1566–74) and Murad III (ruled 1574–95). In his autobiography Biographical Memoir of Construction (Teẕkiretü’l-bünyān), Sinan claimed to have designed 698 building including 80 Friday mosques and more than 400 smaller community mosques (masjids). In reality he led a team of royal architects and the buildings would have been collective works. Sinan himself would have been occupied with the large building projects undertaken for the sultan. These were the Şehzade Mosque (1543–48), the Süleymaniye Mosque (1548–59), the Kirkçeşme waterworks (1561–65), the Büyükçekmece bridge (1565–67) and the Selimiye Mosque in Edirne (1568–74). After this date, during the rule of Murad III, there were no major construction projects and as an old man he would have entrusted the work to other architects.

The following list of 77 Friday mosques was compiled by the historian Gülru Necipoğlu. It is based on the lists appended to two of Sinan's autobiographies: Gift of the Architects (Tuḥfetü’l-miʿmārīn) and Biographical Memoir of Buildings (Teẕkiretü’l-ebniye). The list excludes older mosques that Sinan renovated and those converted into Friday mosques from older community mosques.

== Chronological list of Friday mosques ==
Date	Name	Location	Dome diameter	Listed dependencies
c. 1537	Shahsultan Mosque	Eyüp, Istanbul	hipped roof	non-extant: dervish convent
1538/39–1540	Haseki Sultan Mosque	Haseki, Istanbul	11.3 m (37 ft)	madrassa, hospital, elementary school
1538–39	Çavuşbaşı or Sütlüce Mosque (extensively rebuilt)	Sütlüce, Istanbul	hipped roof	none
1541–42	Tercüman Yunus Beg Mosque (extensively rebuilt)	Balat, Istanbul	hipped roof	madrasa
c. 1541–44	Hadım Ali Pasha Mosque	Diyarbakır, Turkey	14.4 m (47 ft)	madrasa
c. 1542–47	Çukurcuma Mosque (completely rebuilt)	Tophane, Istanbul	hipped roof	none
c. 1543	Nişancı Mustafa Çelebi Mosque (completely rebuilt)	Eyüp, Istanbul	probably hipped roof	non-extant: bath-house
1543–44	Osmanshah's mother (non-extant)	Aksaray, Istanbul	hipped roof	non-extant: madrasa
c. 1543/44–1548	Mihrimah Sultan Mosque	Üsküdar, Istanbul	11.4 m (37 ft)	madrasa; non-extant: hospice
1543–1548	Şehzade Mosque	Şehzadebası, Istanbul	19 m (62 ft)	mausoleum, madrasa, hospice, elementary school, caravansarai
c. 1546–47	Khusrawiyya Mosque (heavily damaged during civil war)	Aleppo, Syria	approx. 18 m (59 ft)	madrasa
1547–48	Sofu Mehmed Pasha Mosque now Sveti Sedmochislenitsi Church (converted to a church in early 20th century)	Sofia, Bulgaria	18.3 m (60 ft)	none
1548–59	Süleymaniye Mosque	Süleymaniye, Istanbul	26.5 m (87 ft)	four madrasas, hadith college, medical college, Quran recitation school, hospital, hospice, caravansarai, bath-house, elementary school
1550–1552/53	Rüstem Pasha Mosque	Tekirdağ, Turkey	13.3 m (44 ft)	hospice, madrasa; non-extant: caravansarai
c. 1550–57	Takiyya al–Khassaki Sultan Mosque (partly extant; see Haseki Sultan Imaret)	Jerusalem		hospice; non-extant: madrasa
1551	Hadim Ibrahim Pasha Mosque	Silivrikapı, Istanbul	12 m (39 ft)	mausoleum; non-extant: bath-house
1551–65	Çerkes İskender Pasha Mosque	Diyarbakır, Turkey	approx. 15 m (49 ft)	none
c. 1552–57	Rüstem Pasha Mosque (completely rebuilt)	Sapanca, Turkey	hipped roof	hospice, bath-house; non-extant: caravansarai
c. 1552	Merkez Efendi Mosque (completely rebuilt)	Yenikapı, Istanbul	hipped roof	bath-house
c. 1552	Tatar Khan or Juma-Jami Mosque	Yevpatoria, Crimea, Ukraine	6.0 m (19.7 ft)	non-extant: mausoleum
1553–54	Kapıağası Mahmud Agha Mosque (extensively rebuilt)	Ahırkapı, Istanbul	probably hipped roof	non-extant: madrasa, mausoleum
1553–54	Defterelar Ebulfaz Mehmed Efendi Mosque (non-extant)	Tophane, Istanbul	hipped roof	non-extant: mausoleum
1554–58/59	Sulaymaniyya Takiyya Mosque	Damascus, Syria	10 m (33 ft)	hospice, madrasa
1554–55	Kazasker Abdurrahman Çelebi Mosque (non-extant)	Çapa, Istanbul	hipped roof	non-extant: mausoleum
1554–55/56	Sinan Pasha Mosque	Beşiktaş, Istanbul	12.6 m (41 ft)	madrasa; non-extant: bath-house
1555 (planned), c. 1565–71/72	Kara Ahmed Pasha Mosque	Topkapı, Istanbul	12 m (39 ft)	madrasa, mausoleum
1556–65/66	Al-Adiliyah Mosque	Aleppo, Syria	unknown	none
c. 1557–60	Rüstem Pasha Mosque (non-extant)	Samanlı (now Yalova)	probably hipped roof	non-extant: caravansarai
c. 1557–60	Rüstem Pasha Mosque (non-extant)	Bolu, Turkey	probably hipped roof	non-extant: double caravansarai
1558	Selimiye Mosque	Konya	12 m (39 ft)	(Architect was probably Sinan)
1557–58	Karađoz Bey Mosque	Mostar, Bosnia and Herzegovina	10.7 m (35 ft)	none
1559–60	Haseki Sultan Mosque (non-extant)	Svilengrad, Bulgaria	hipped roof	non-extant: hospice
1559–60	Cihangir Mosque (completely rebuilt)	Cihangir, Istanbul	hipped roof	none
1559–60	İskender Pasha Mosque (extensively rebuilt)	Kanlıca, Istanbul	hipped roof	mausoleum; non-extant: madrasa, bath-house
1559–60	Ferhad Pasha Mosque (extensively rebuilt)	Kastamonu, Turkey	hipped roof	none
c. 1560/61–1562/63	Hürrem Çavus Mosque	Karagümrük, Istanbul	hipped roof	none
1560–63/64	Sultaniya Mosque	Karapınar, Turkey	14.8 m (49 ft)	hospice, bath-house, caravansarai
c. 1661–65	Semiz Ali Pasha Mosque	Marmara Ereğlisi	hipped roof	none
c. 1561	Rüstem Pasha Mosque (extensively renovated)	Bolvadin, Turkey	13.9 m (46 ft)	none
c. 1561–63	Rüstem Pasha Mosque	Tahtakale, Istanbul	15.2 m (50 ft)	none
c. 1563–70	Mihrimah Sultan Mosque	Edirnekapı, Istanbul	20.3 m (67 ft)	madrasa, bath–house
1562–63	Ferruh Kethüda Mosque	Balat, Istanbul	hipped roof	none
1562–63	Odabaşı Behruz Agha Mosque (extensively rebuilt)	Şehremini, Istanbul	hipped roof	non-extant: bath-house
c. 1562–63	Binaemini Sinan Agha Mosque	Yenibahçe, Istanbul	hipped roof	none
1562–63	Lala Mustafa Pasha Mosque	Erzurum, Turkey	10.6 m (35 ft)	none
1565–69/70	Sokollu Mehmed Pasha Mosque	Lüleburgaz, Turkey	12.5 m (41 ft)	madrasa; non-extant: hospice, caravansarai
c. 1565–73	Piyale Pasha Mosque	Kasımpaşa, Istanbul	6 × 8.9 m (29 ft)	none
1565–66	Cenabi Ahmed Pasha Mosque	Ankara, Turkey	14.4 m (47 ft)	none
c. 1565–69/70	Firdevs Pasha Mosque	Isparta, Turkey	12.4 m (41 ft)	none
c. 1564/65–1572/73	Behram Pasha Mosque	Diyarbakır, Turkey	15.9 m (52 ft)	none
c. 1566–70	Lala Hüseyin Pasha Mosque	Kütahya, Turkey	12.5 m (41 ft)	none
c. 1566–78	Sokollu Mustafa Pasha Mosque (non-extant)	Budapest, Hungary	unknown	non-extant: mausoleum
c. 1566/67–70	Osman Shah Mosque	Trikala, Greece	18 m (59 ft)	none
1567–68	Köse Hüsrev Pasha Mosque	Van, Turkey	14.8 m (49 ft)	non-extant: madrasa
1567–68	Mevlana Efendi Mosque (completely rebuilt)	Üsküdar, Istanbul	hipped roof	none
c. 1567/68–1571/72	Sokollu Mehmed Pasha Mosque	Kadırgalimanı, Istanbul	13 m (43 ft)	madrasa, dervish convent
1567–74	Sokollu Mehmed Pasha Mosque	Payas, Turkey	approx. 8 m (26 ft)	hospice, caravansarai
1568–74	Selimiye Mosque	Edirne, Turkey	31.2 m (102 ft)	madrasa, hadith college, Quran recitation school
c. 1569–74	Defterdar Mustafa Çelebi Mosque (dome rebuilt)	Edirne, Turkey	12 m (39 ft)	none
c. 1569–75 (1585–86 portico and courtyard)	Semiz Ali Pasha Mosque	Babaeski, Turkey	14 m (46 ft)	non-extant: madrasa
1571–83 (expanded 1584–85/86)	Atik Valide Mosque	Üsküdar, Istanbul	12.7 m (42 ft)	madrasa, Quran recitation school, hospital, dervish convent, caravansarai, bath-house
c. 1570–84	Molla Çelebi Mosque	Beyoğlu, Istanbul	11.8 m (39 ft)	non-extant: bath-house
1570–71	Murad Pasha Mosque (extensively renovated)	Baghdad, Iraq	unknown	none
1572–79/80	Pertev Pasha Mosque	İzmit, Turkey	16.4 m (54 ft)	none
1573–77	Sokollu Kasim Bey Mosque (missing portico)	Havsa, Turkey	approx. 13 m (43 ft)	hospice, bath-house; non-extant: caravansarai
c. 1573–77/78	Sokollu Mehmed Pasha Mosque	Azapkapı, Istanbul	11.8 m (39 ft)	bath-house
c. 1575–88	Ferhad Pasha Mosque	Çatalca, Turkey	9.2 m (30 ft)	none
c. 1576–85/86	Haci Ahmed Pasha Mosque	Kayseri, Turkey	12.3 m (40 ft)	none
1577–90	Zal Mahmud Pasha Mosque	Eyüp, Istanbul	12.4 m (41 ft)	mausoleum, twin madrasas
1578–80/81	Kılıç Ali Pasha Mosque	Tophane, Istanbul	12.7 m (42 ft)	mausoleum, bath-house
1580–81	Şemsi Pasha Mosque	Üsküdar, Istanbul	8.2 m (27 ft)	mausoleum, madrasa; non-extant: dervish convent
1583–86/87	Muradiye Mosque	Manisa, Turkey	10.6 m (35 ft)	hospice
1584–85	Mehmed Agha Mosque	Çarşamba, Istanbul	11.8 m (39 ft)	mausoleum
1584–85/86	Mesih Mehmed Pasha Mosque	Hırka-i Şerif, Istanbul	12.8 m (42 ft)	mausoleum
1584/85–88/89	Nişancı Mehmed Pasha Mosque	Karagümrük, Istanbul	14.2 m (47 ft)	mausoleum
1585	Hacı Evhad Mosque	Yedikule, Istanbul	hipped roof	none
1585–86	Ramazan Efendi Mosque	Kocamustafapaşa, Istanbul	hipped roof	none
c. 1587–91	Melek Ahmed Pasha Mosque	Diyarbakır, Turkey	11.5 m (38 ft)	none

== See also ==
- List of mosques commissioned by the Ottoman dynasty

== Sources ==
- Necipoğlu, Gülru (2005). The Age of Sinan: Architectural Culture in the Ottoman Empire. London: Reaktion Books. ISBN 978-1-86189-253-9.
