= Pertev Pasha Mosque =

Mosque in İzmit, Kocaeli, Turkey

- Pertev Paşa Camii
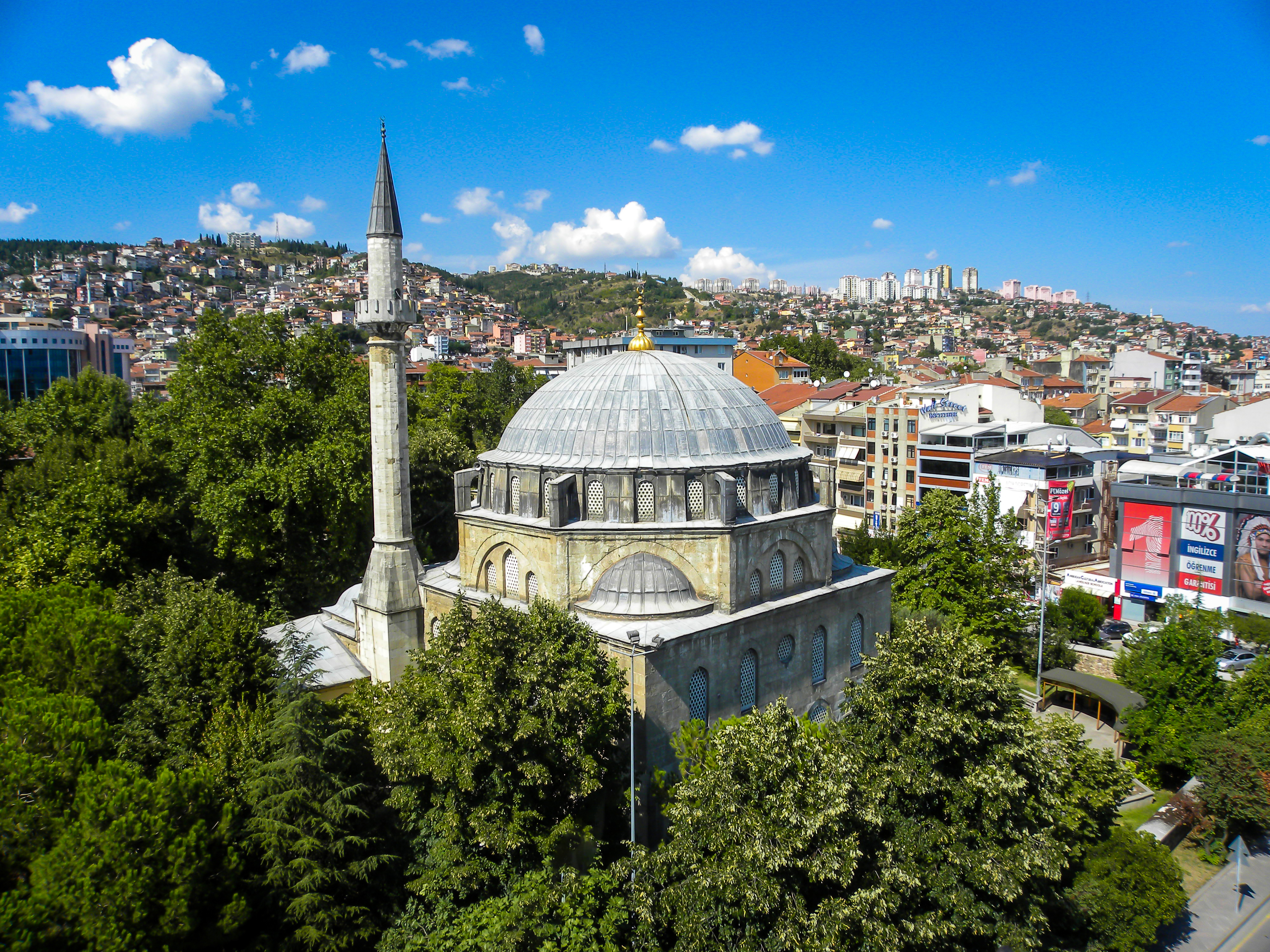

- Location of the mosque in Turkey

Religion
- Affiliation: Islam
- Ecclesiastical or organizational status: Mosque
- Status: Active

Location
- Location: İzmit, Kocaeli Province
- Country: Turkey
- Interactive map of Pertev Pasha Mosque
- Coordinates: 40°45′46″N 29°55′52″E

Architecture
- Architect: Mimar Sinan
- Type: Mosque architecture
- Style: Ottoman
- Groundbreaking: 1572
- Completed: 1580

Specifications
- Dome: One
- Dome dia. (outer): 16.4 metres (54 ft)
- Minaret: One
- Materials: Ashlar

The Pertev Mehmet Paşa Mosque (Turkish: Pertev Paşa Camii), also known as Yeni Cuma Cami (lit. 'New Friday Mosque'), is a mosque located in the town of Izmit, in the province of Kocaeli, Turkey.

== Overview ==
Designed by Mimar Sinan and completed in the 16th-century Ottoman style, the mosque was built for Pertev Mehmed Paşa, an Ottoman vizier during the reigns of sultan Suleyman I and Selim II. The construction was finished in 1579.

The mosque is part of a larger Külliye complex that included a madrasa, hammam, caravanserai, fountain, and a lower education school. The mosque has a single domed structure and the dome has 24 windows. The minaret was damaged during the 1999 İzmit earthquake.

== See also ==
- Islam in Turkey
- List of mosques in Turkey
- List of Friday mosques designed by Mimar Sinan
