= Sokollu Mehmed Pasha Mosque, Azapkapı =

Mosque in Beyoğlu, Istanbul, Turkey

Sokollu Mehmed Pasha Mosque
- Sokollu Mehmet Paşa Camii
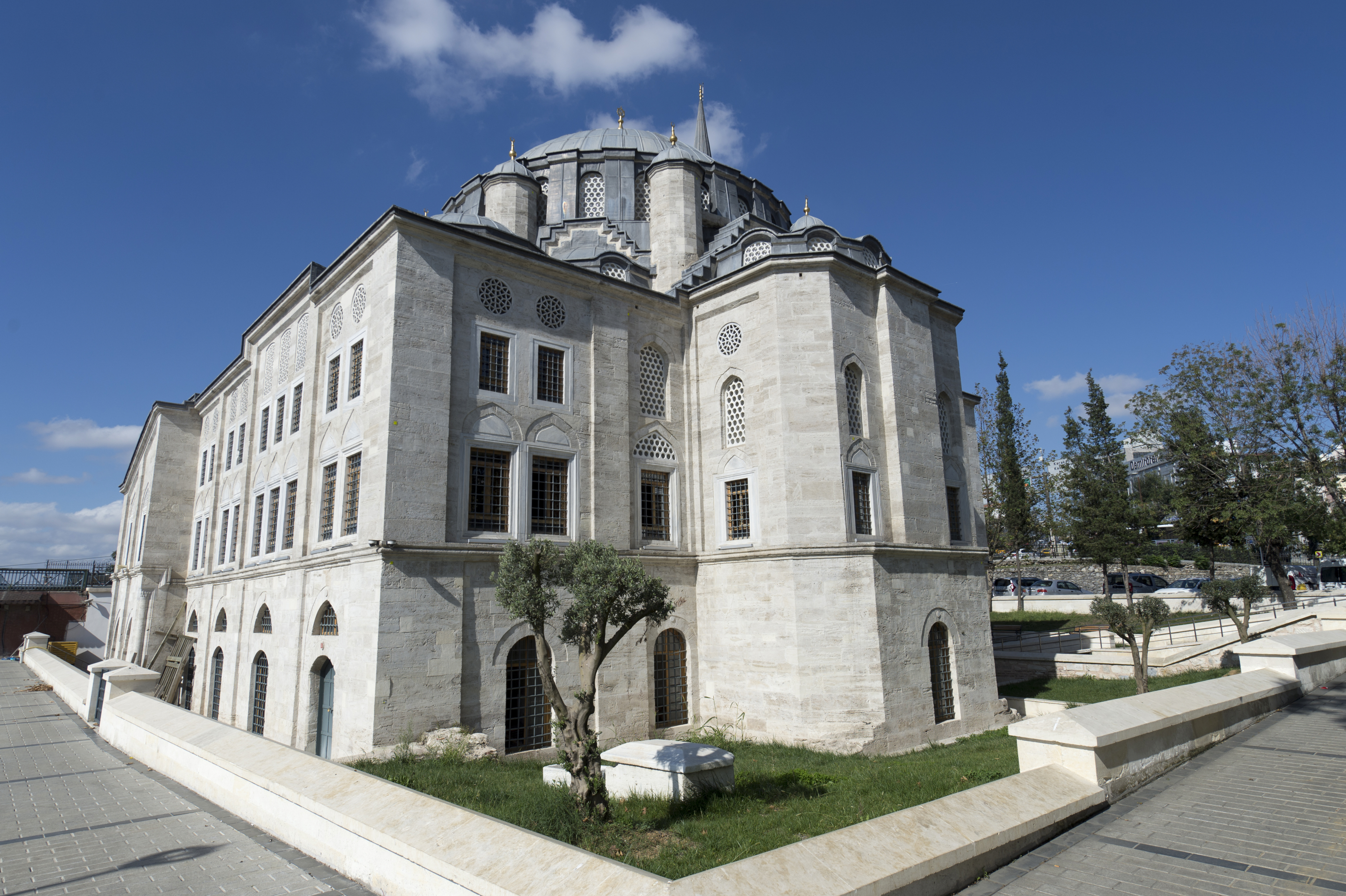

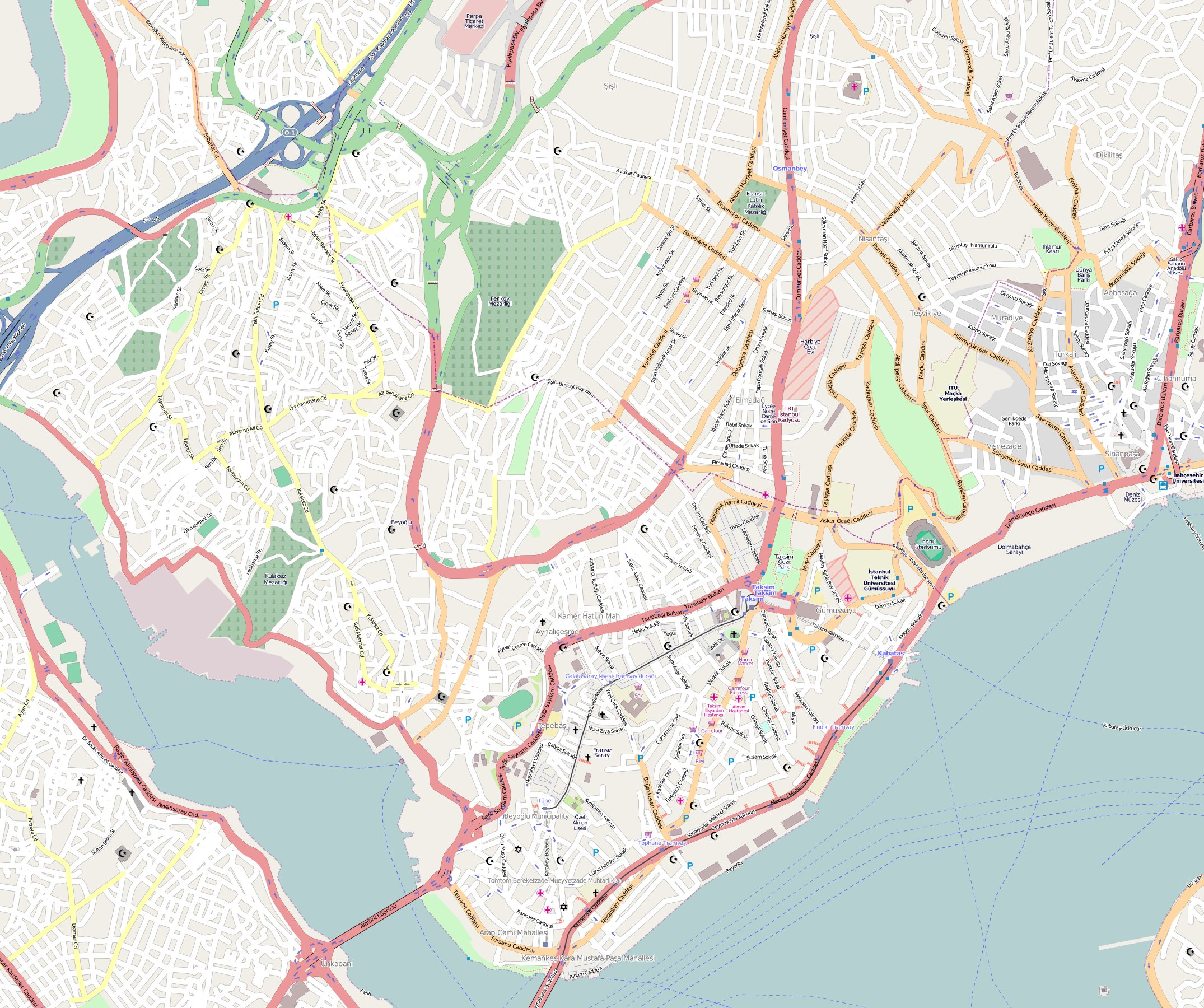
- Location within the Beyoğlu district of Istanbul

Religion
- Affiliation: Sunni Islam

Location
- Location: Istanbul, Turkey
- Coordinates: 41°01′30″N 28°58′04″E

Architecture
- Architect: Mimar Sinan
- Type: mosque
- Groundbreaking: c. 1573
- Completed: 1577-78

Specifications
- Dome dia. (outer): 11.8 m (39 ft)
- Minaret: 1

The Sokollu Mehmed Pasha Mosque (Turkish: Sokollu Mehmet Paşa Camii) is a 16th-century Ottoman mosque located in Istanbul, Turkey.

The mosque is situated in Azapkapı neighborhood of Beyoğlu district in Istanbul. It is directly beside the Atatürk Bridge across the Golden Horn, but there was no bridge here at the time the mosque was built. It was designed by Ottoman imperial architect Mimar Sinan (c. 1488/1490-1588) and built for the grand vizier Sokollu Mehmed Pasha (in office 1565–1579) in 1578. It is one of the three mosques with the same name built by Mimar Sinan in Istanbul.

== See also ==
- List of Friday mosques designed by Mimar Sinan
- List of mosques in Istanbul

== Gallery ==
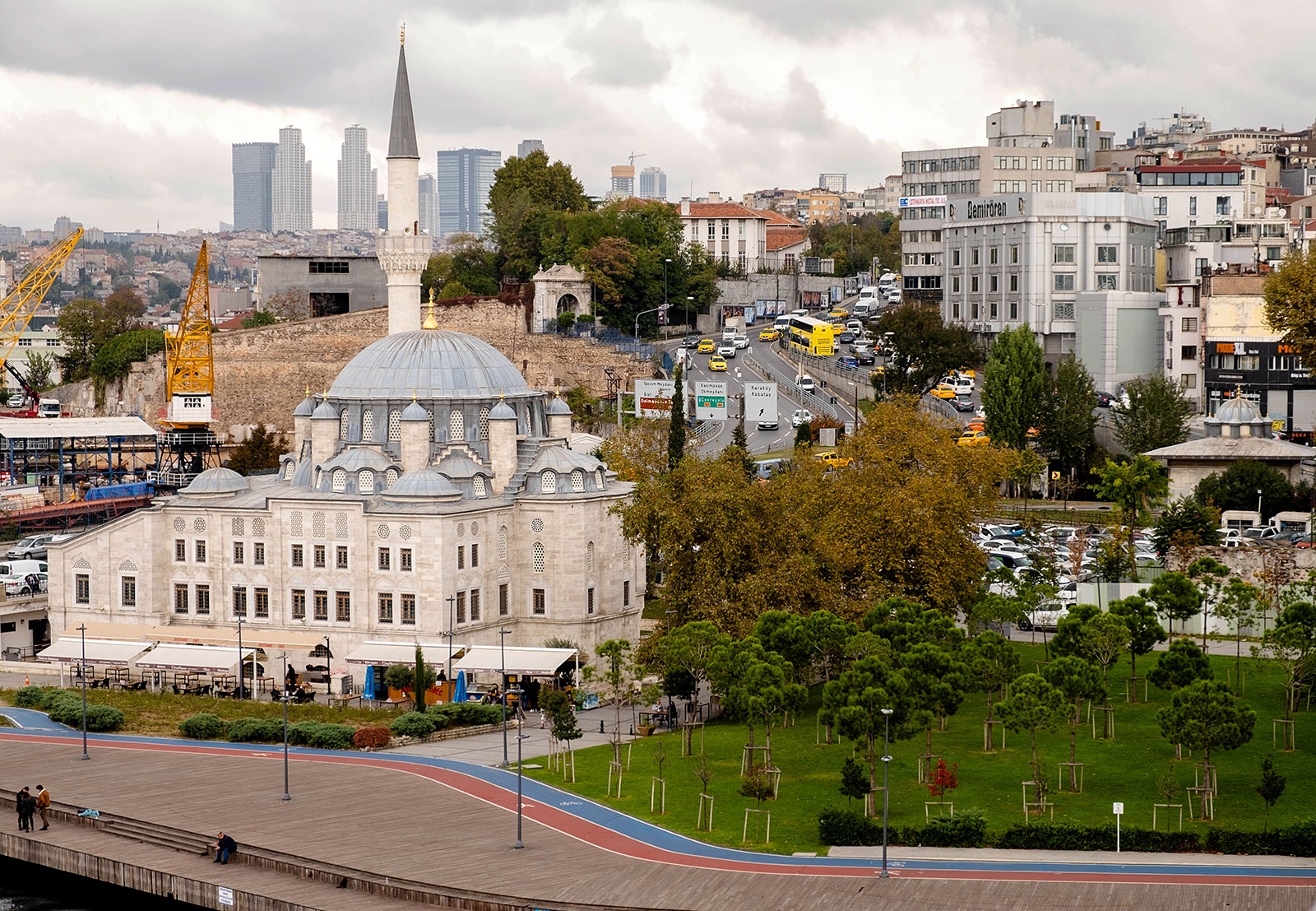
Sokollu Mehmet Pasha Mosque Azapkapi. View from the Metro at Halic station.

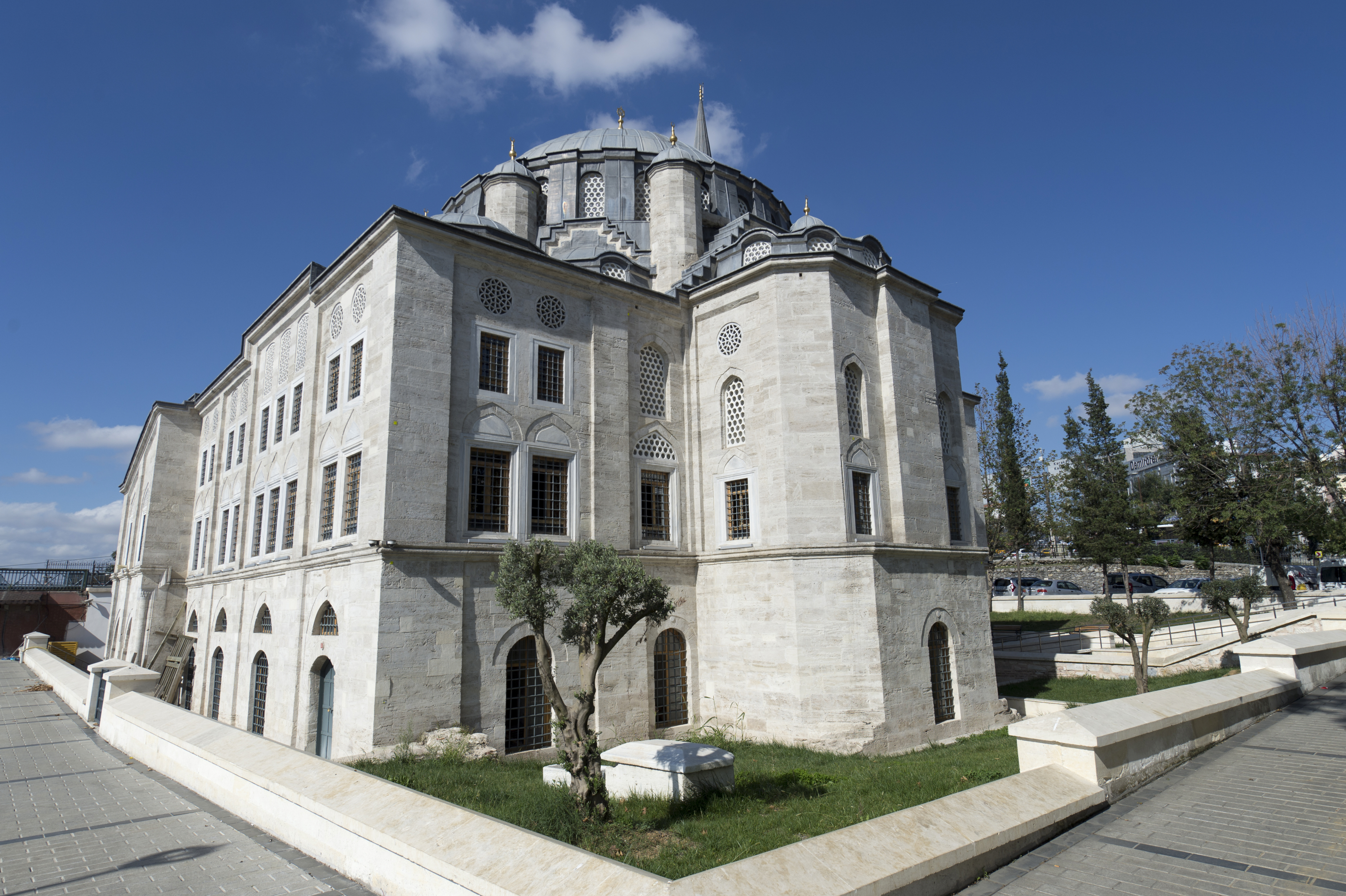
Sokollu Mehmet Pasha Mosque Azapkapi exterior

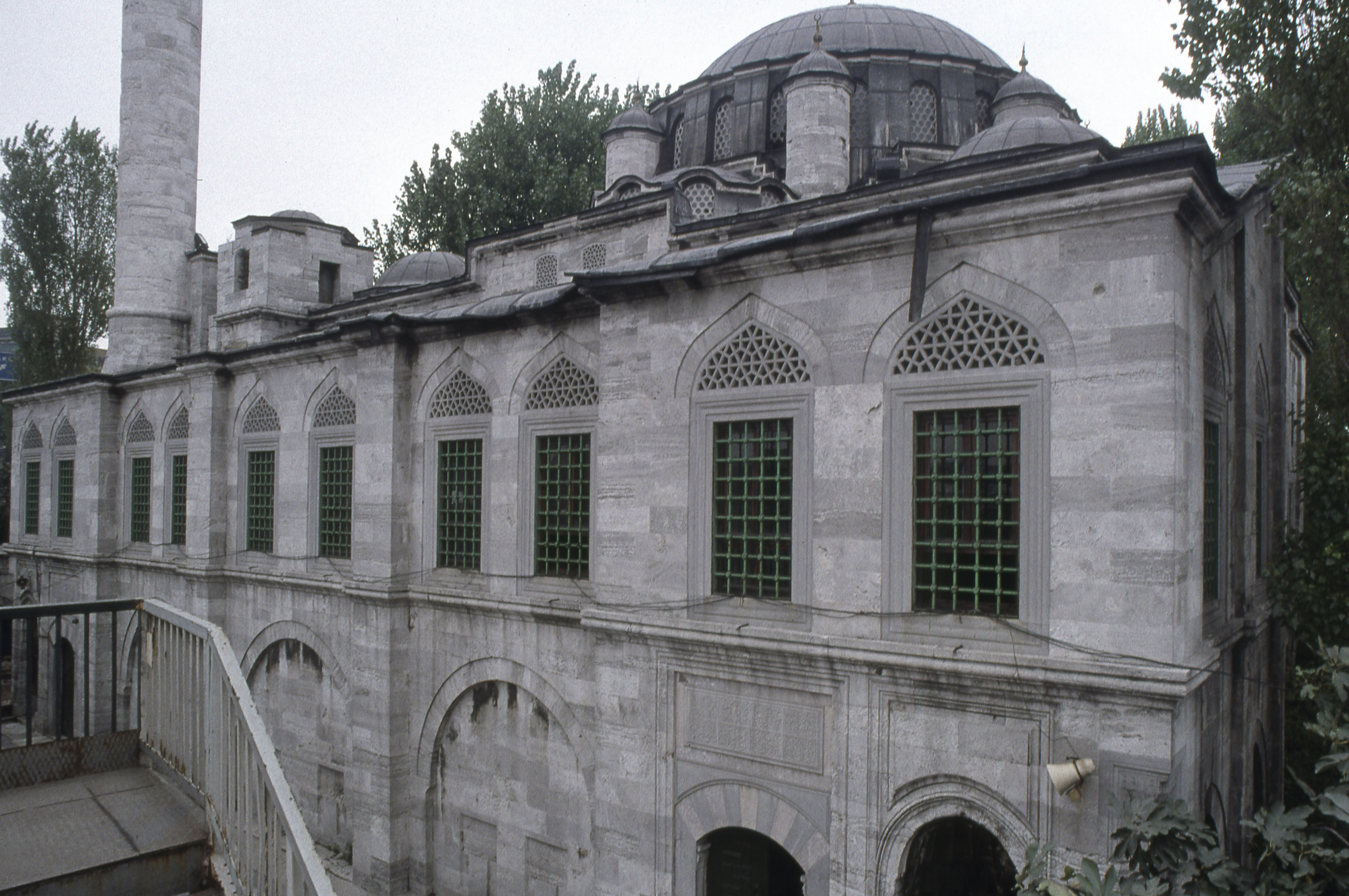
Sokollu Mehmet Pasha Mosque Azapkapi exterior

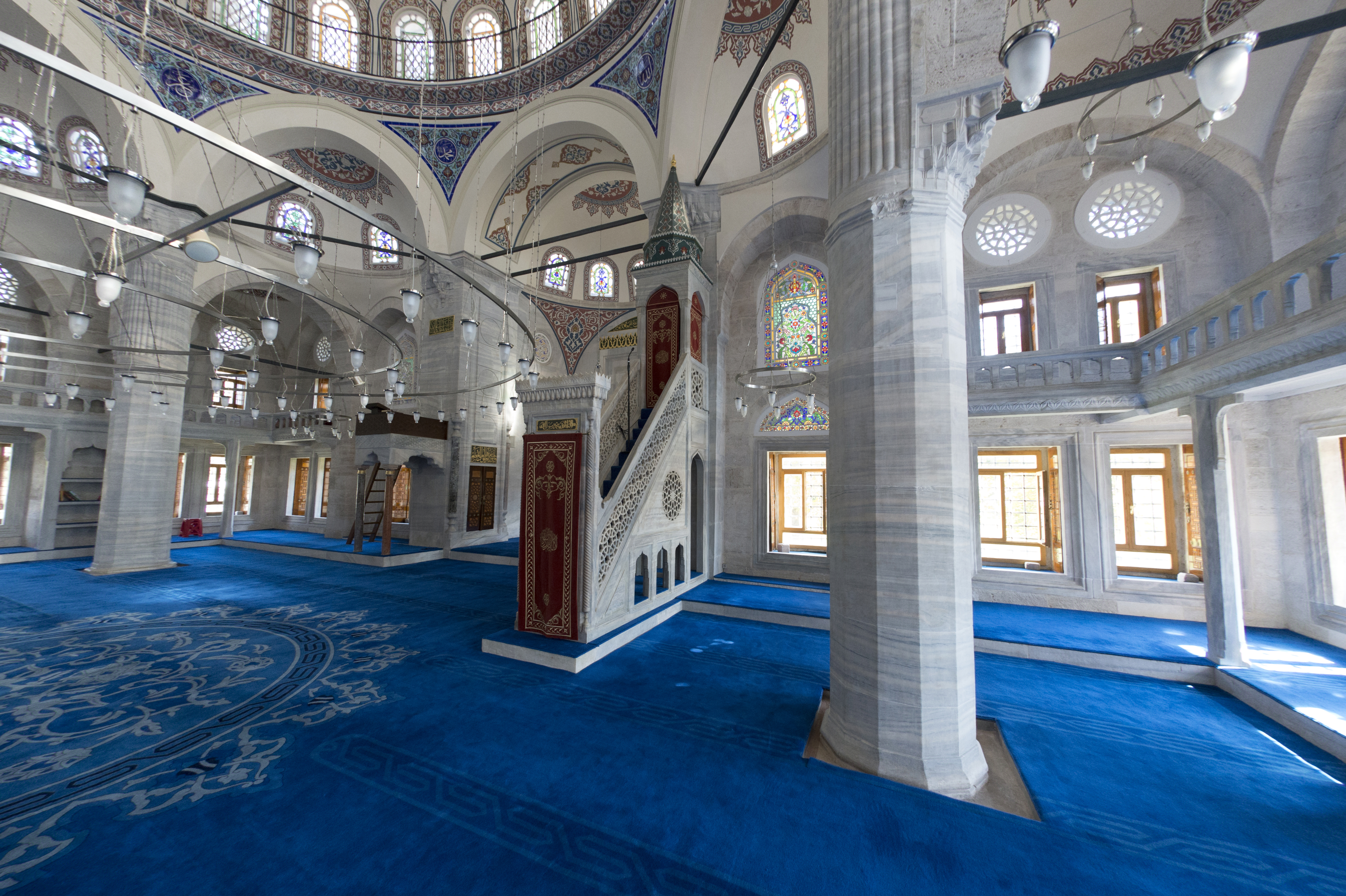
Sokollu Mehmet Pasha Mosque Azapkapi general view interior

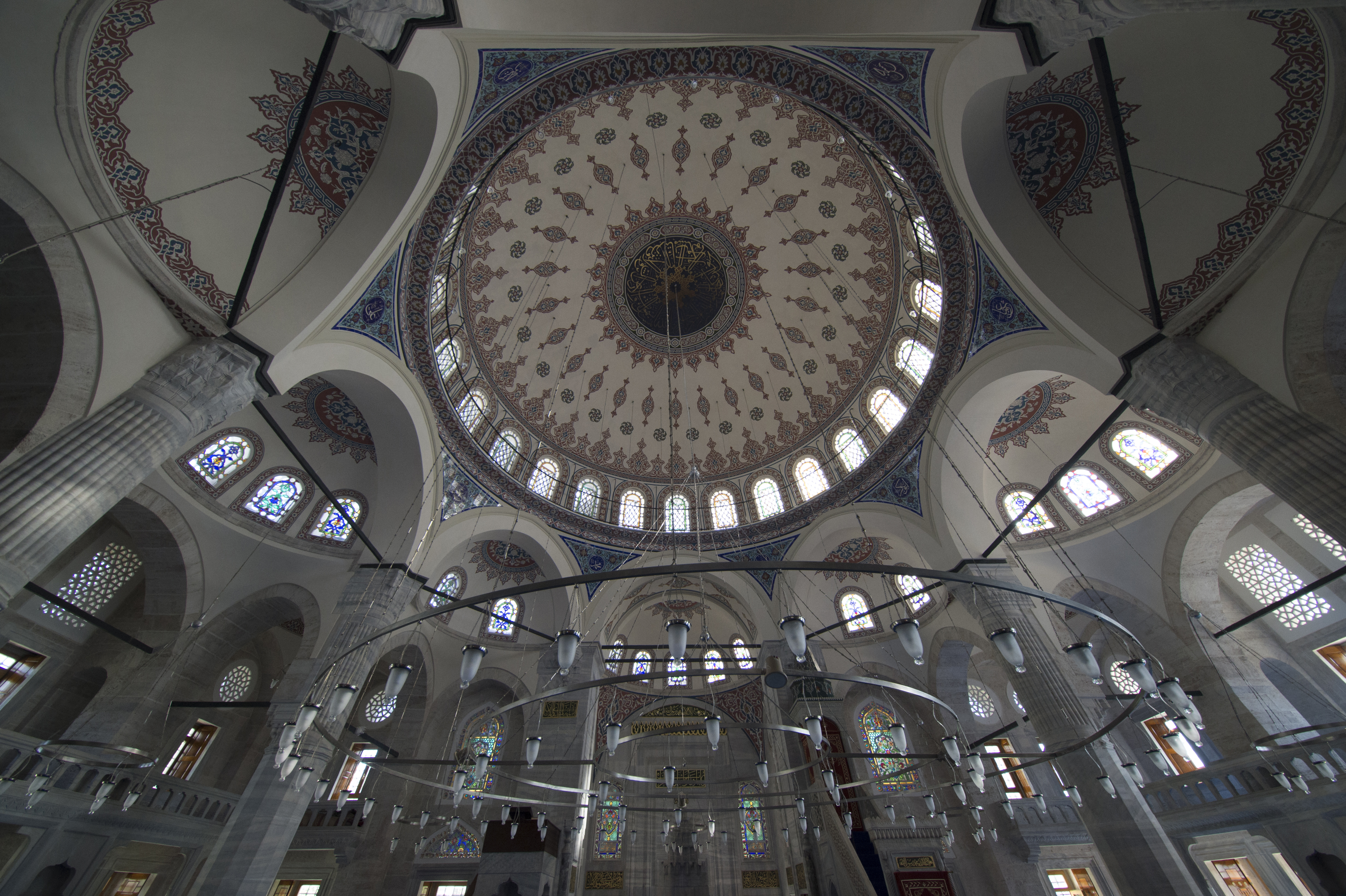
Sokollu Mehmet Pasha Mosque Azapkapi domes

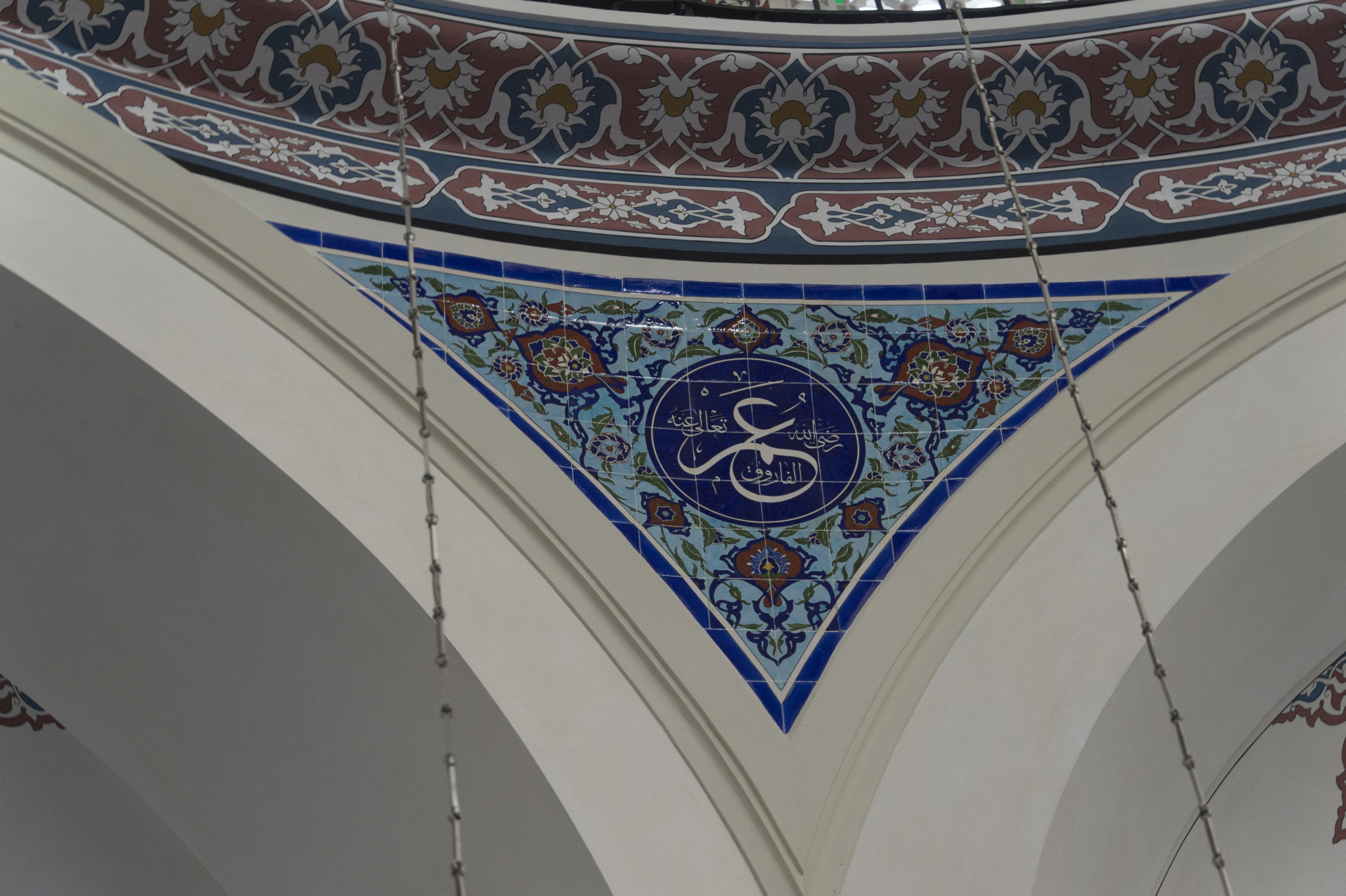
Sokollu Mehmet Pasha Mosque Azapkapi decoration under dome

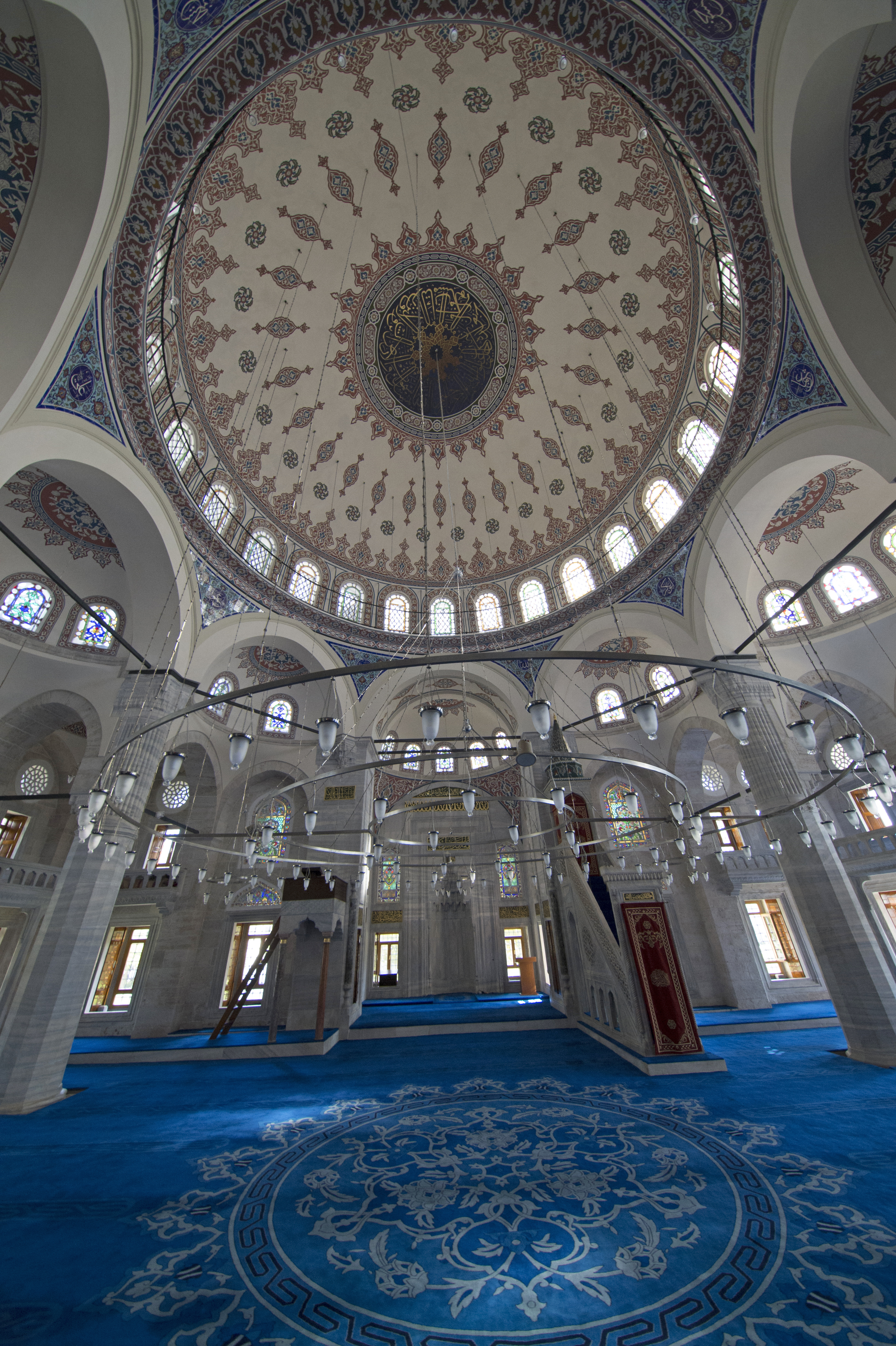
Sokollu Mehmet Pasha Mosque Azapkapi minber and mihrab and dome

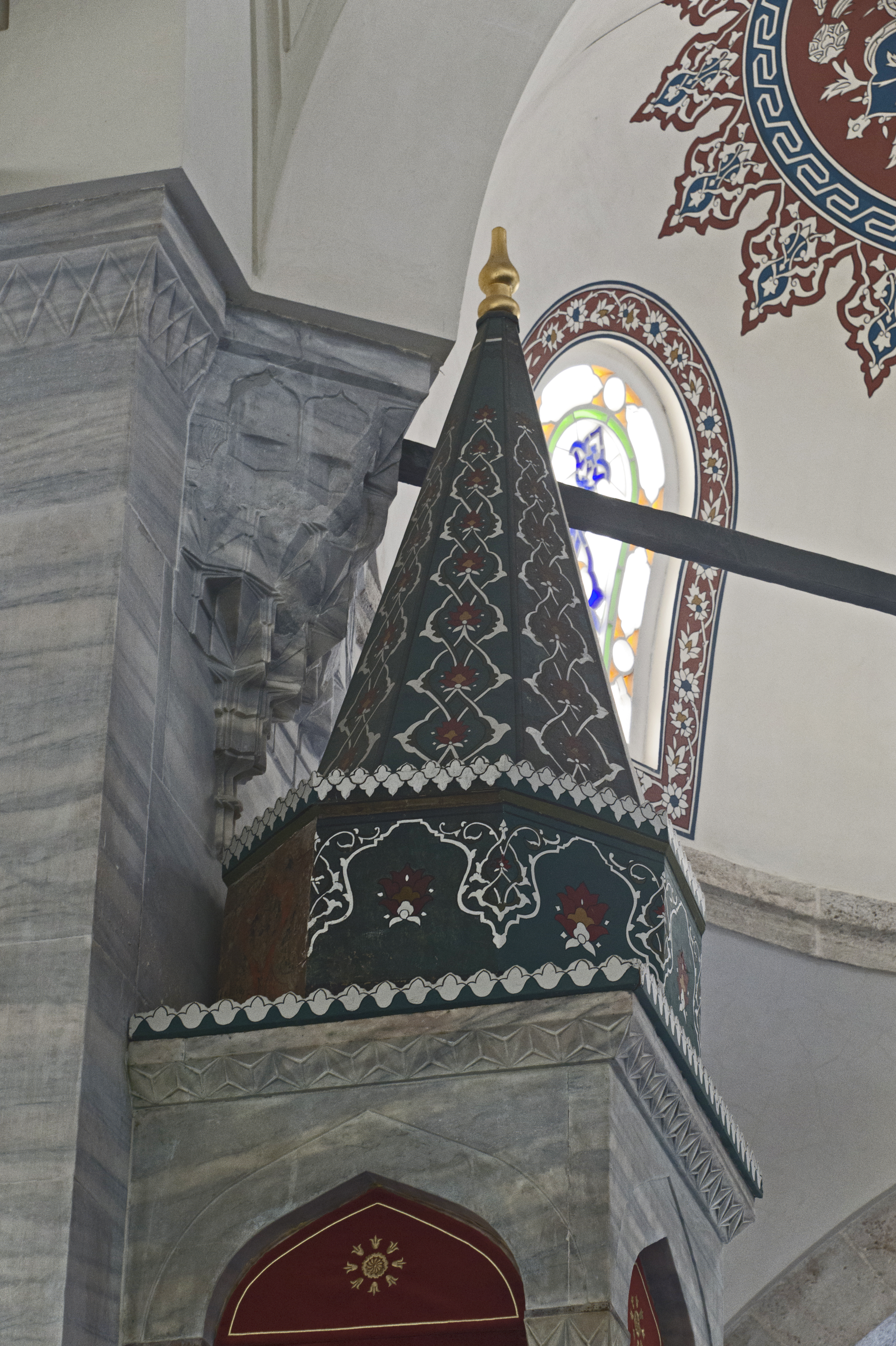
Sokollu Mehmet Pasha Mosque Azapkapi top minber

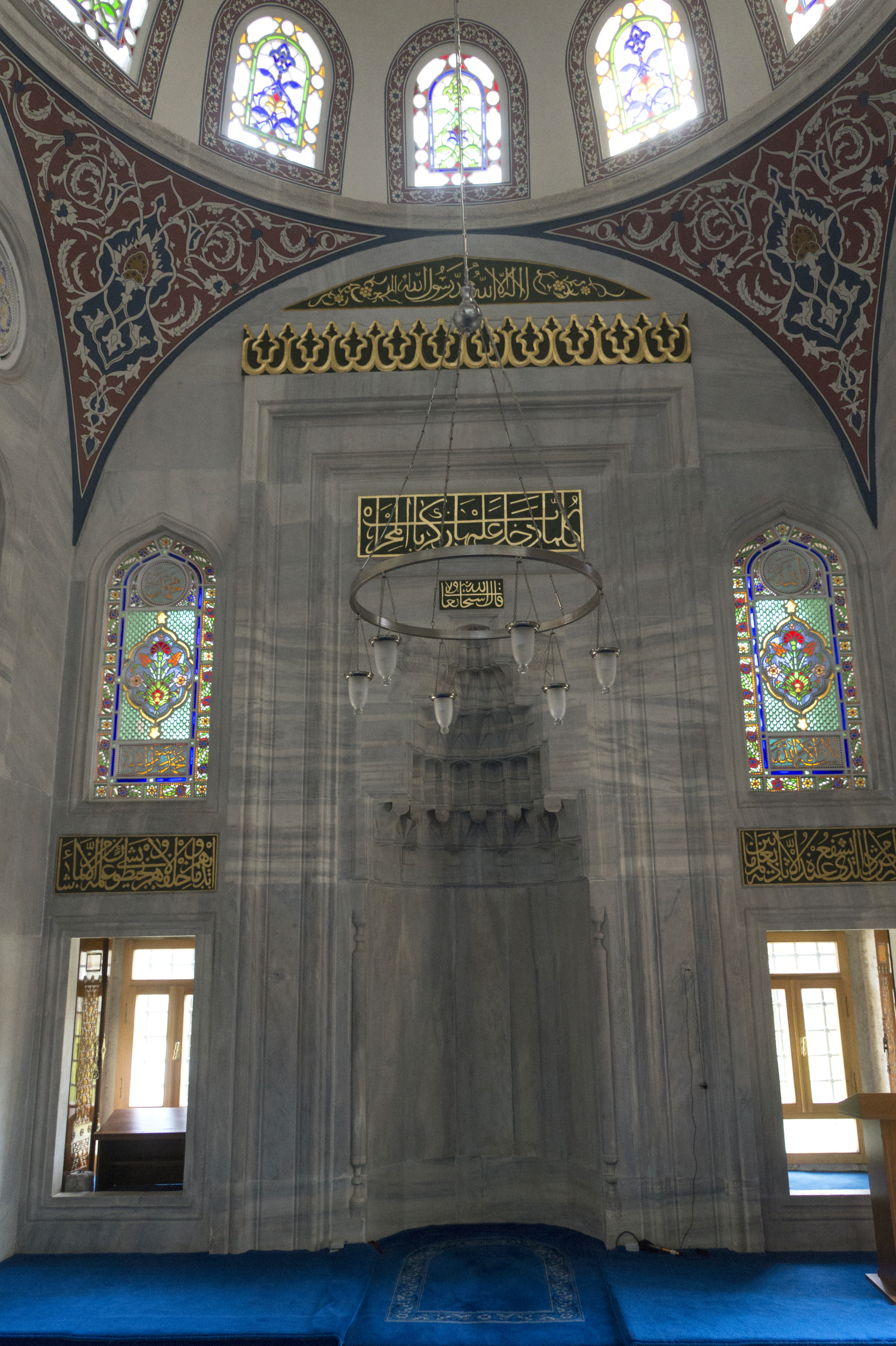
Sokollu Mehmet Pasha Mosque Azapkapi mihrab

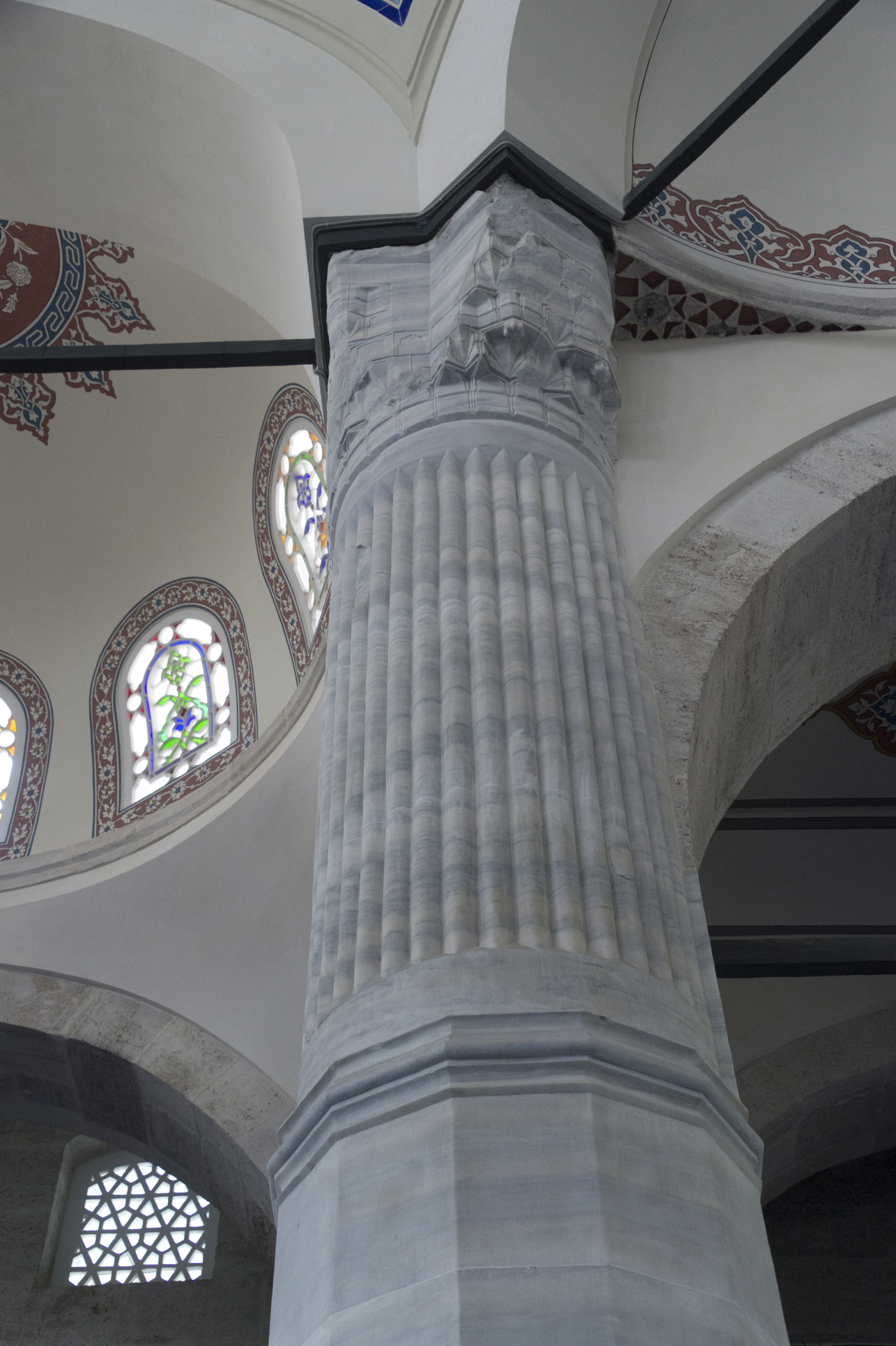
Sokollu Mehmet Pasha Mosque Azapkapi column

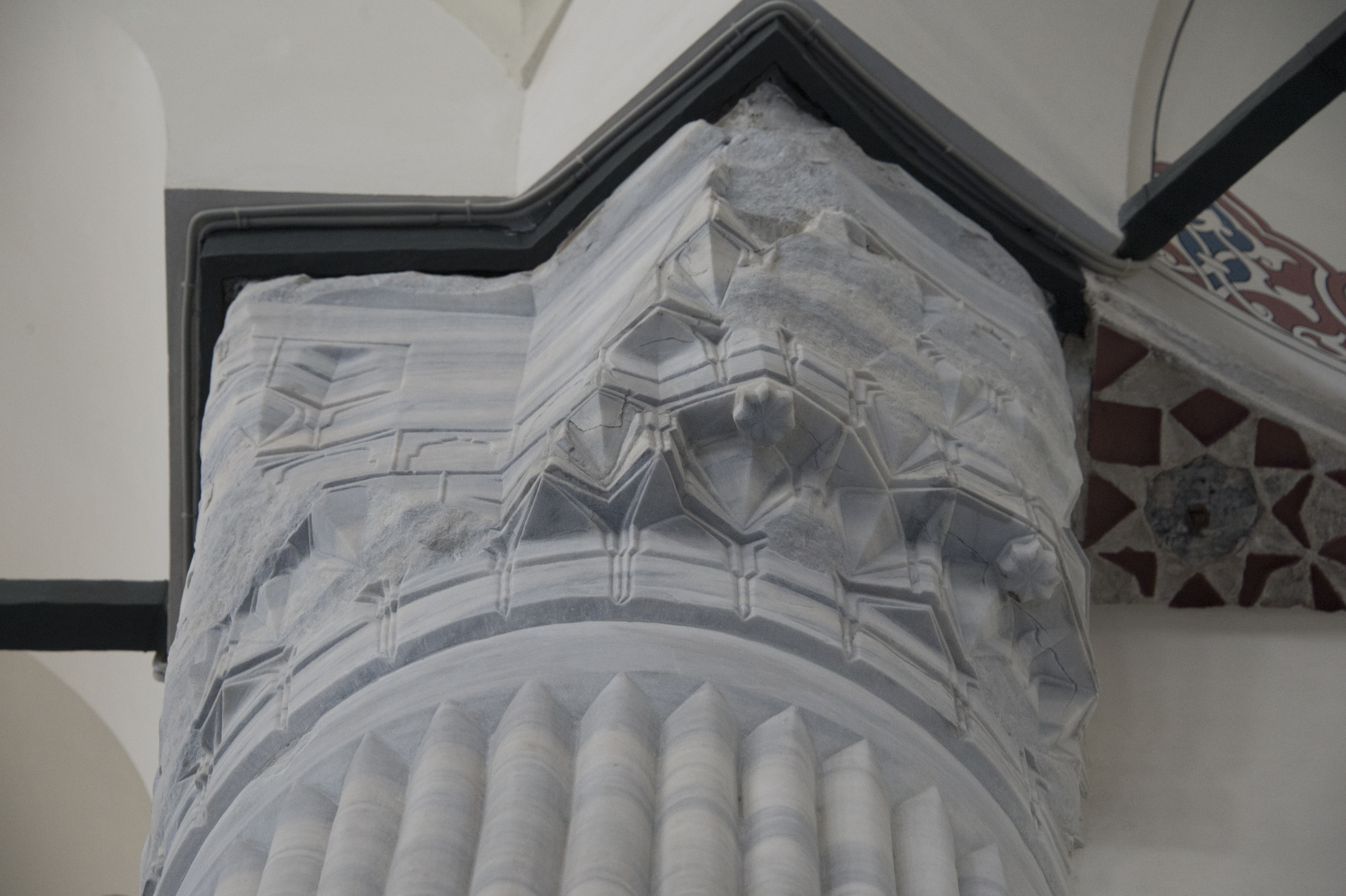
Sokollu Mehmet Pasha Mosque Azapkapi column detail

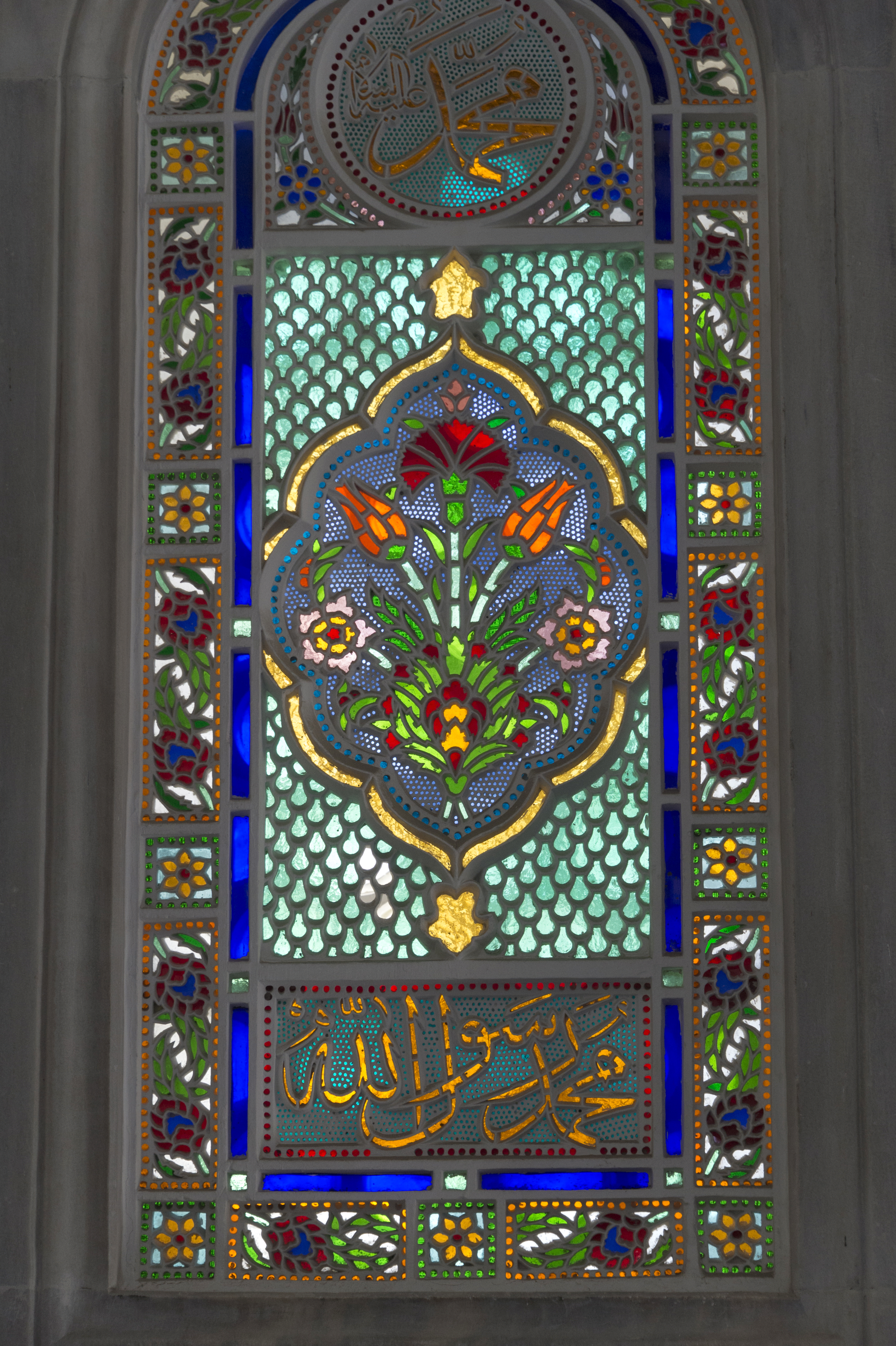
Sokollu Mehmet Pasha Mosque Azapkapi coloured window

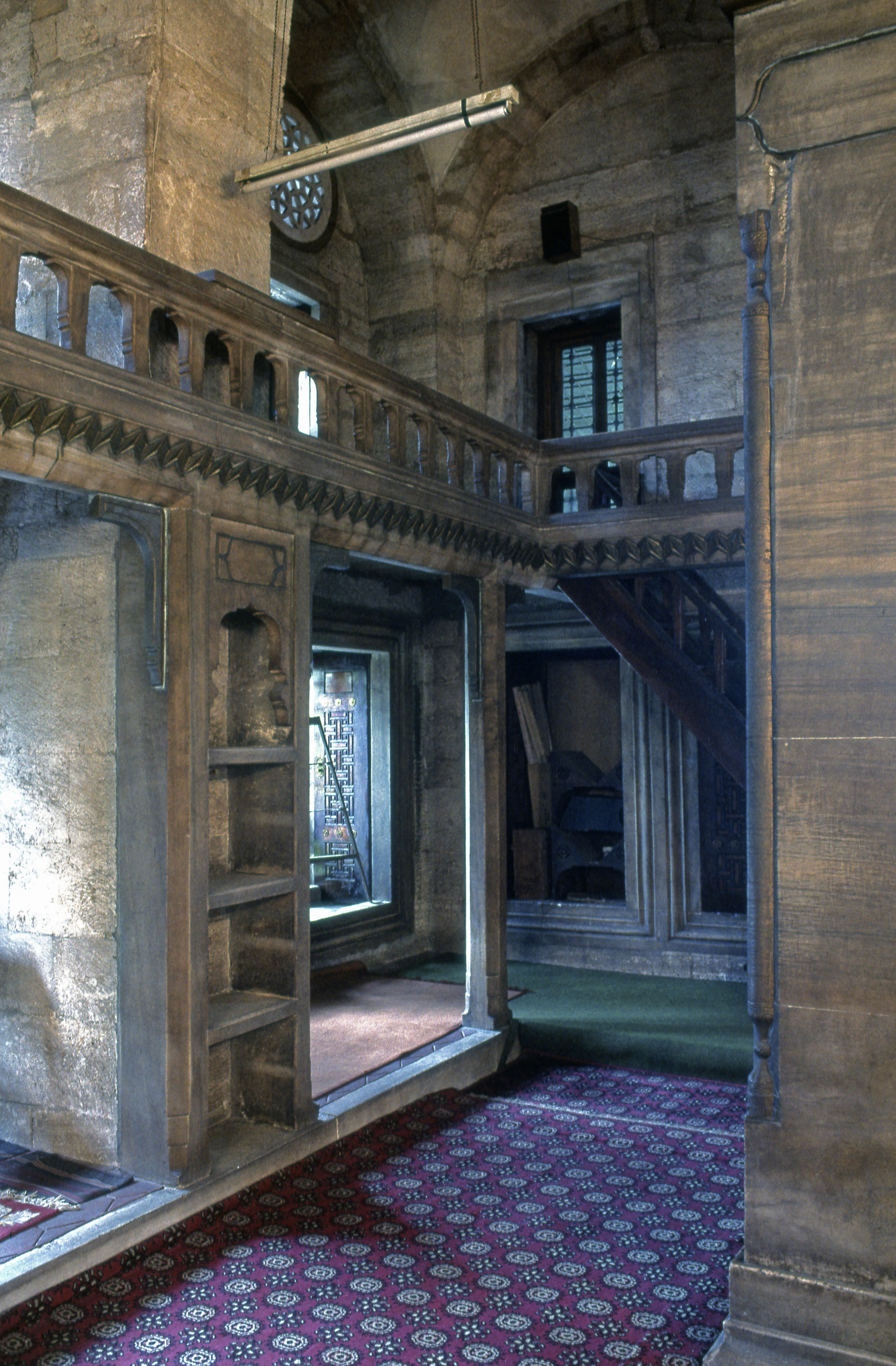
Sokollu Mehmet Pasha Mosque Azapkapi interior
