= Behram Pasha Mosque =

Mosque in Sur, Diyarbakır, Turkey

- Behram Paşa Camii; Mizgefta Behram Paşa
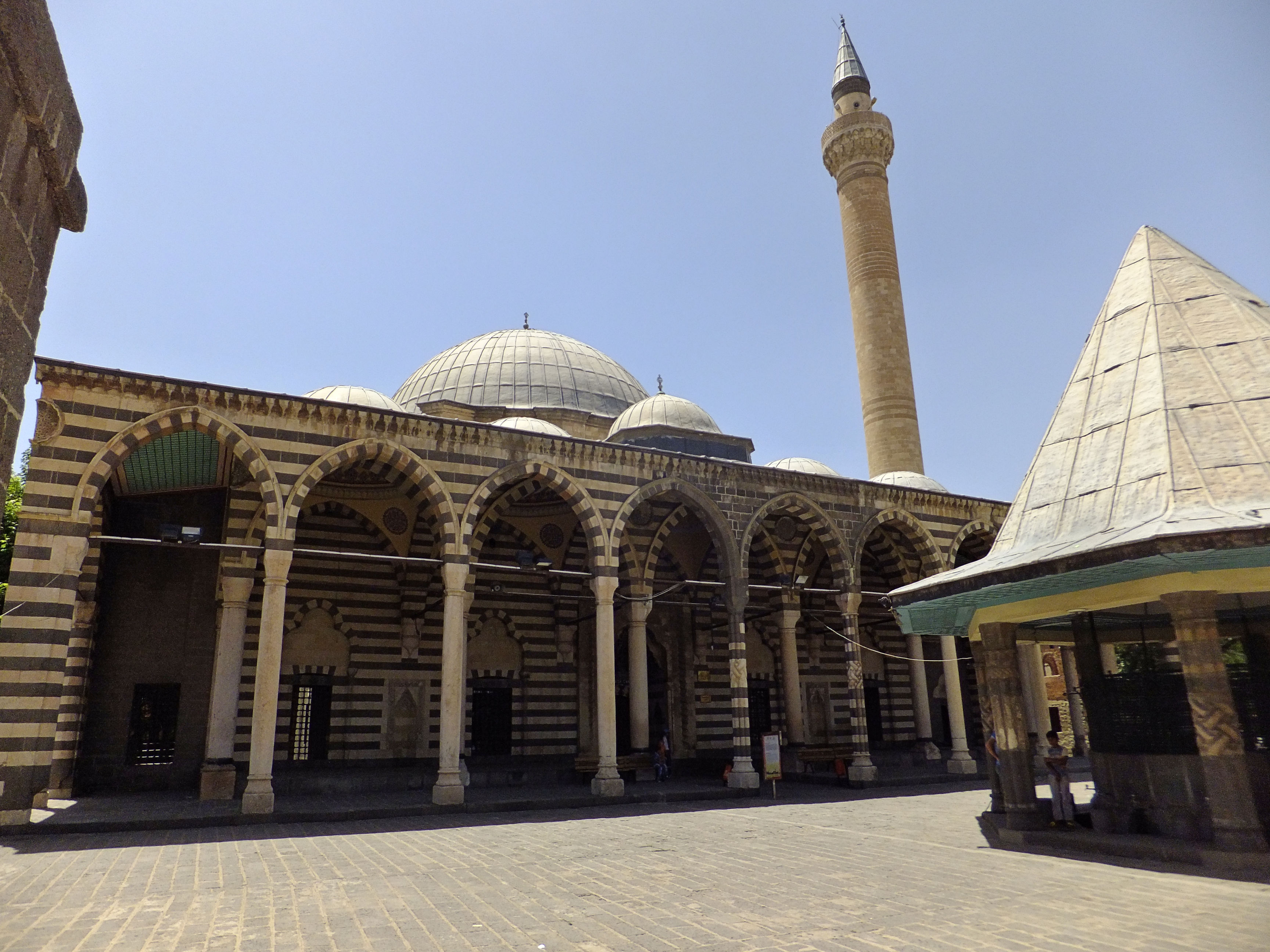

- Location within Turkey

Religion
- Affiliation: Islam

Location
- Location: Sur, Diyarbakır, Turkey
- Coordinates: 37.9094°N 40.2342°E

Architecture
- Architect: Sinan
- Type: Mosque
- Style: Ottoman architecture
- Groundbreaking: c. 1564/65
- Completed: 1572/73

Specifications
- Dome dia. (outer): 15.9 m (52 ft)
- Minaret: 1
- Materials: alternating layers of white limestone and black basalt

Behram Pasha Mosque (Turkish: Behram Paşa Camii, Kurdish: Mizgefta Behram Paşa) is a 16th-century Ottoman mosque located in the town of Diyarbakır in southeast Turkey. It was commissioned by the Ottoman governor-general Behram Pasha.

== History ==
The mosque was commissioned by the local Ottoman governor-general Behram Pasha. He was the son of Kara Şahin Mustafa Pasha who served as the governor-general of Yemen and Egypt. The dates of Behram Pasha's tenure in Diyarbakır are uncertain but were probably between 1564–65 and 1567–68. He died in 1585 and was buried in Aleppo. Building began in around 1564–65 and was completed by 1572–73 (AH 980), the date included in the Arabic inscription carved above the entrance portal. The mosque is attributed to Sinan in one of his two major autobiographies (Tuḥfetü'l-mi'mārīn) but not in the other (Tezkiretü'l-ebniye), which may suggest that Sinan had a marginal role in its design, possibly by approving the plans in Istanbul (the Ottoman capital) to be executed by another architect. The identity of the architect who oversaw the construction is not known but it may have been another imperial architect sent from Istanbul, if not a local master, given the quality of its construction. (Note: Doğan Kuban states more generally that the mosque was "probably designed by an imperial architect sent from the capital.") The distinctive use of local features alongside the Ottoman design also suggests that the architect employed a team of local masons and craftsmen.

== Architecture ==
=== Exterior ===
An octagonal drinking fountain is aligned with the central portal of the north façade. The pyramidal roof of the fountain is supported by composite black and white columns with braided central sections. The north façade of the mosque is constructed in alternation layers of black and white stone. The double portico has five domes. The two central columns supporting the outer portico have a braided central section placed between alternating layers of black and white stone, echoing those of the fountain. The remaining columns supporting the portico are of white marble. A single minaret sits at the northwest corner of the portico. The mosque itself is in the form of an unlayered domed cube. The dome sits on a sixteen-sided drum which has windows on each of the sides.

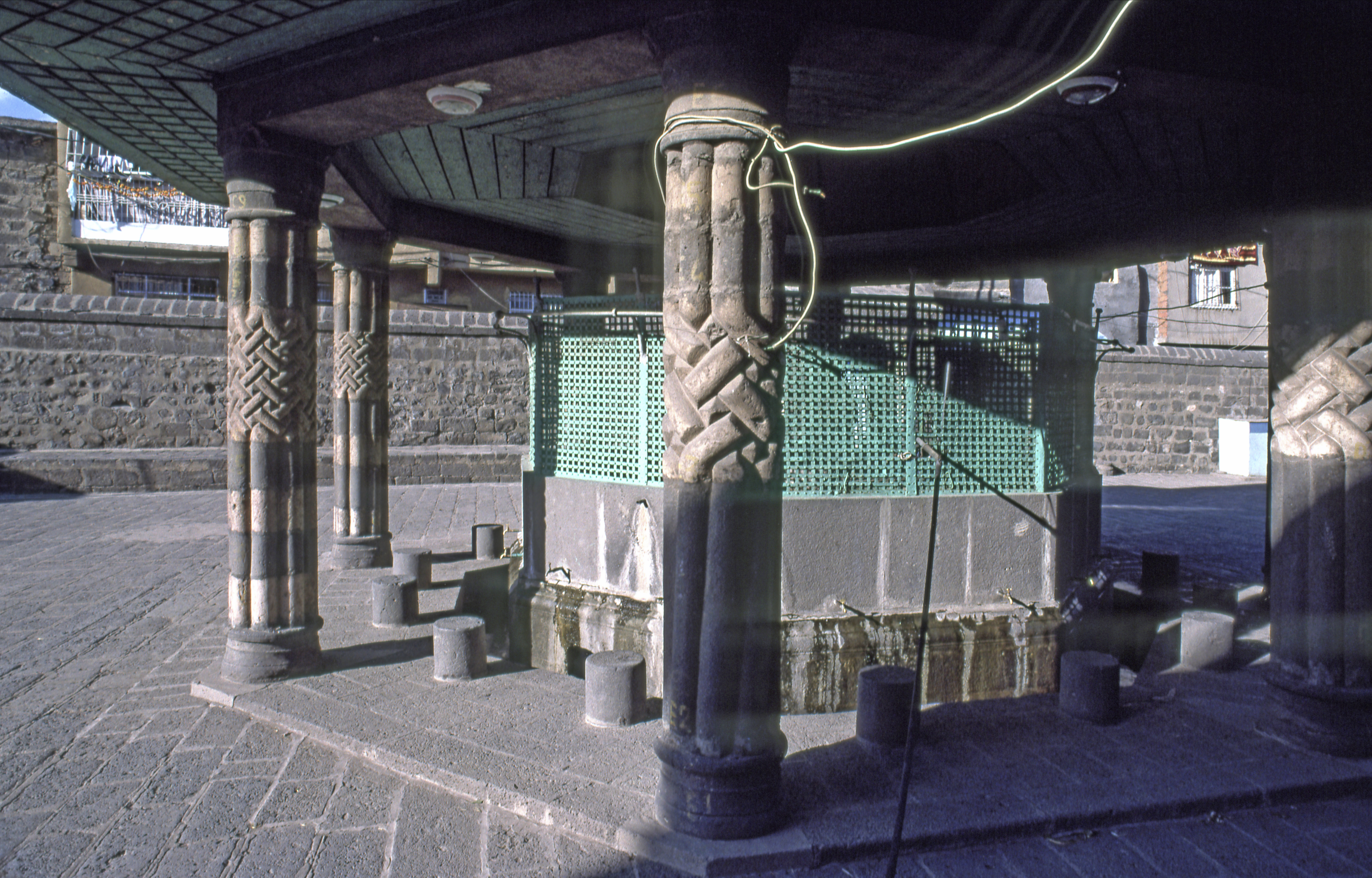
The ablutions fountain or shadirvan in front of the mosque

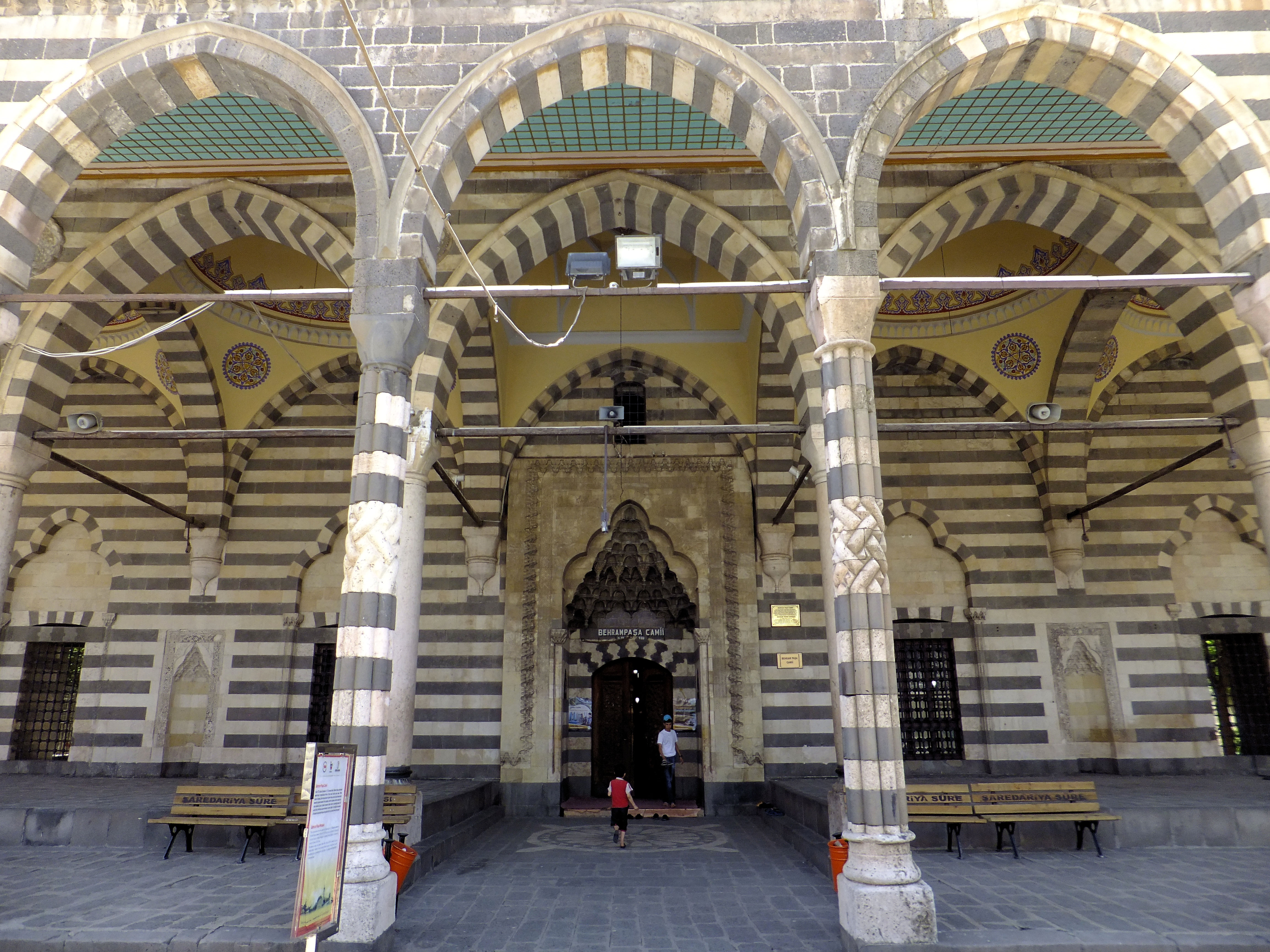
Front portico and entrance to the mosque

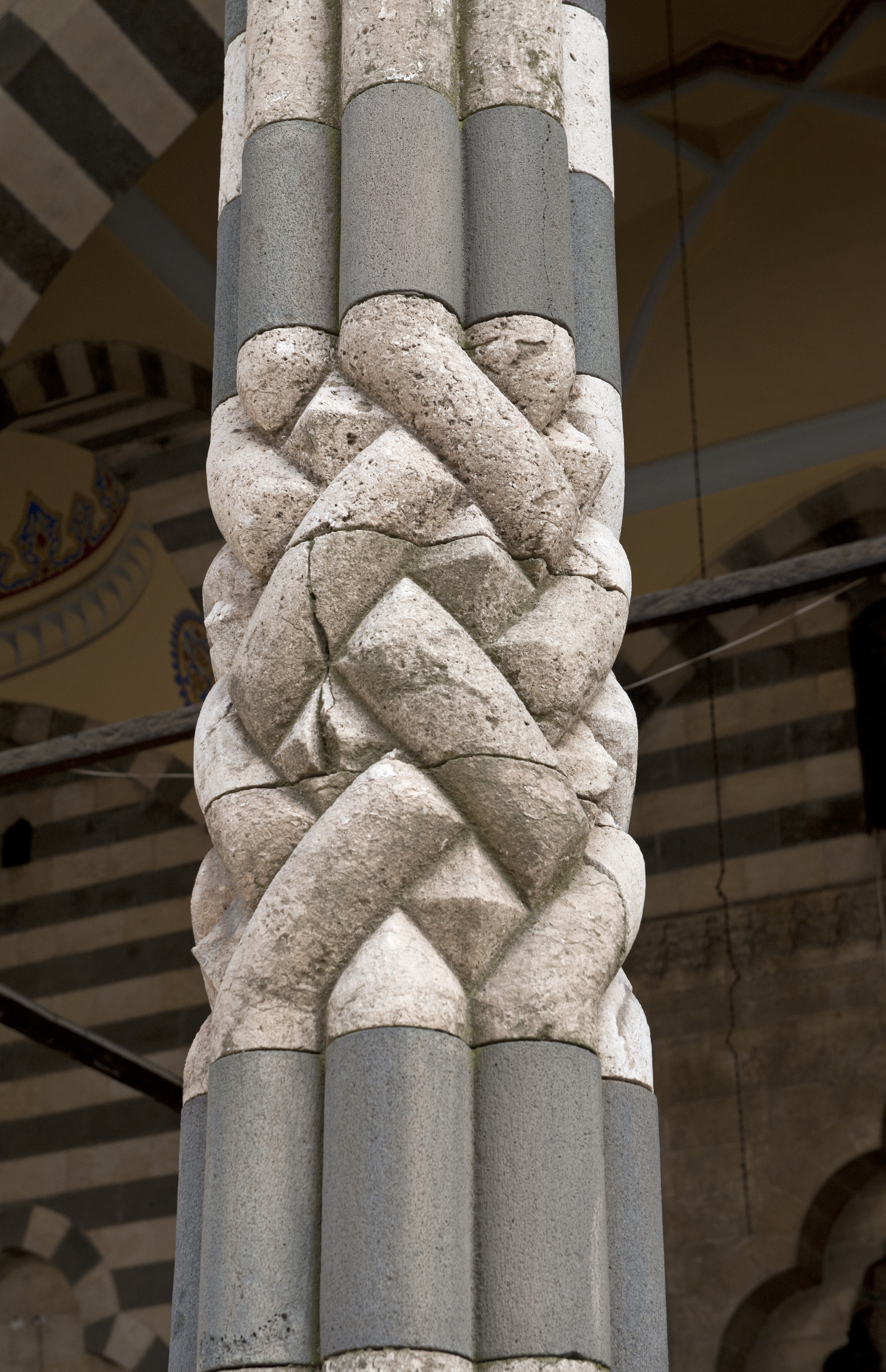
Carved details of one of the columns of the portico

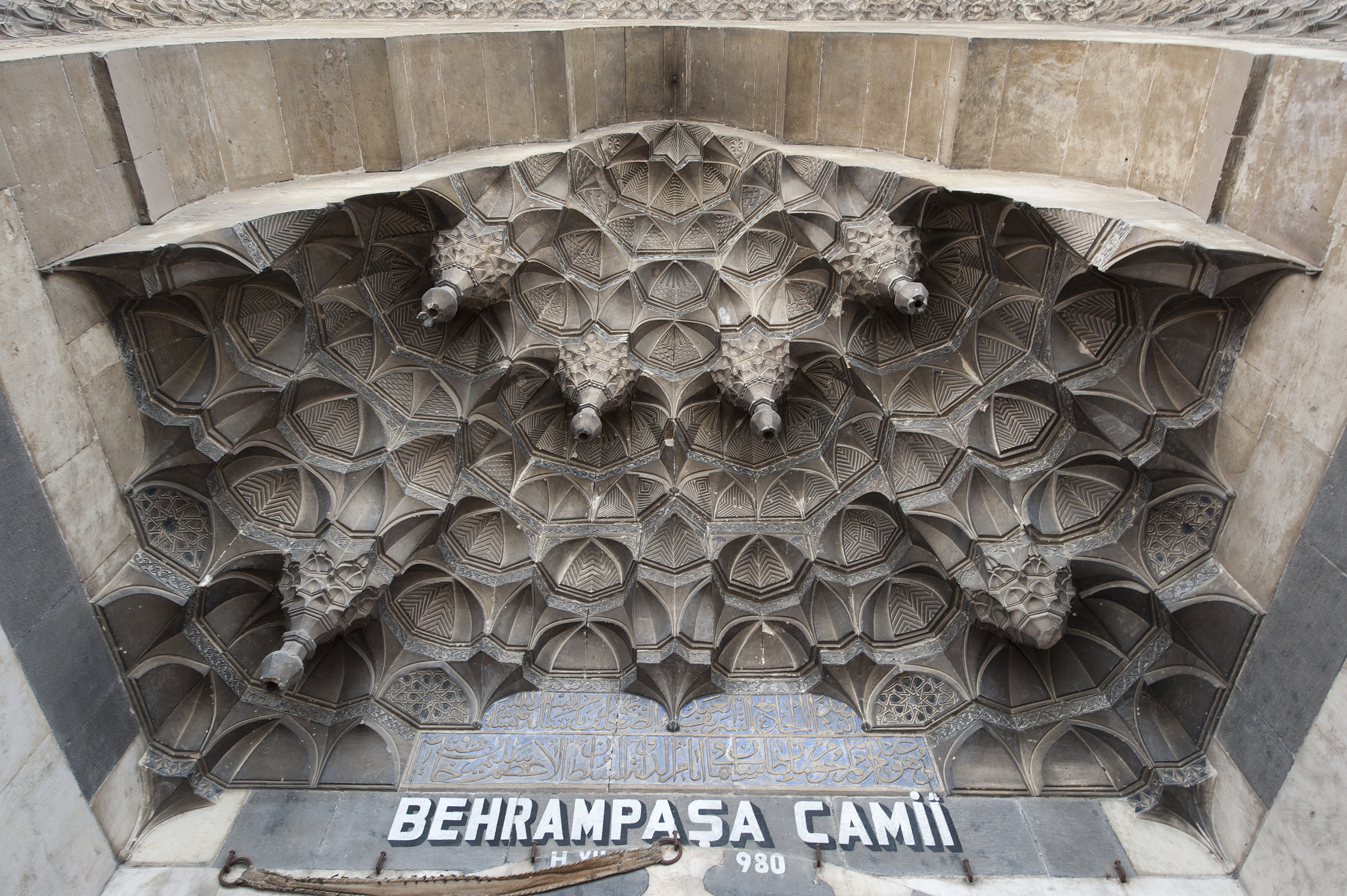
Entrance portal of the mosque with muqarnas hood in carved stone

=== Interior ===
The 15.9 metres (52 ft) diameter dome is supported by eight pointed arches. The dados of the prayer hall are decorated with large square polychrome underglazed tiles. These have a border of two styles of rectangular tiles. The tiles are believed to have been produced locally in Diyarbakır but are very similar to those produced in İznik.

The design of the mosque has been praised by architectural historians. Godfrey Goodwin wrote in 1971: "It is, indeed, the prince of provincial mosques as splendid in its decoration as it is in its proportions within the limits of the severe local style."

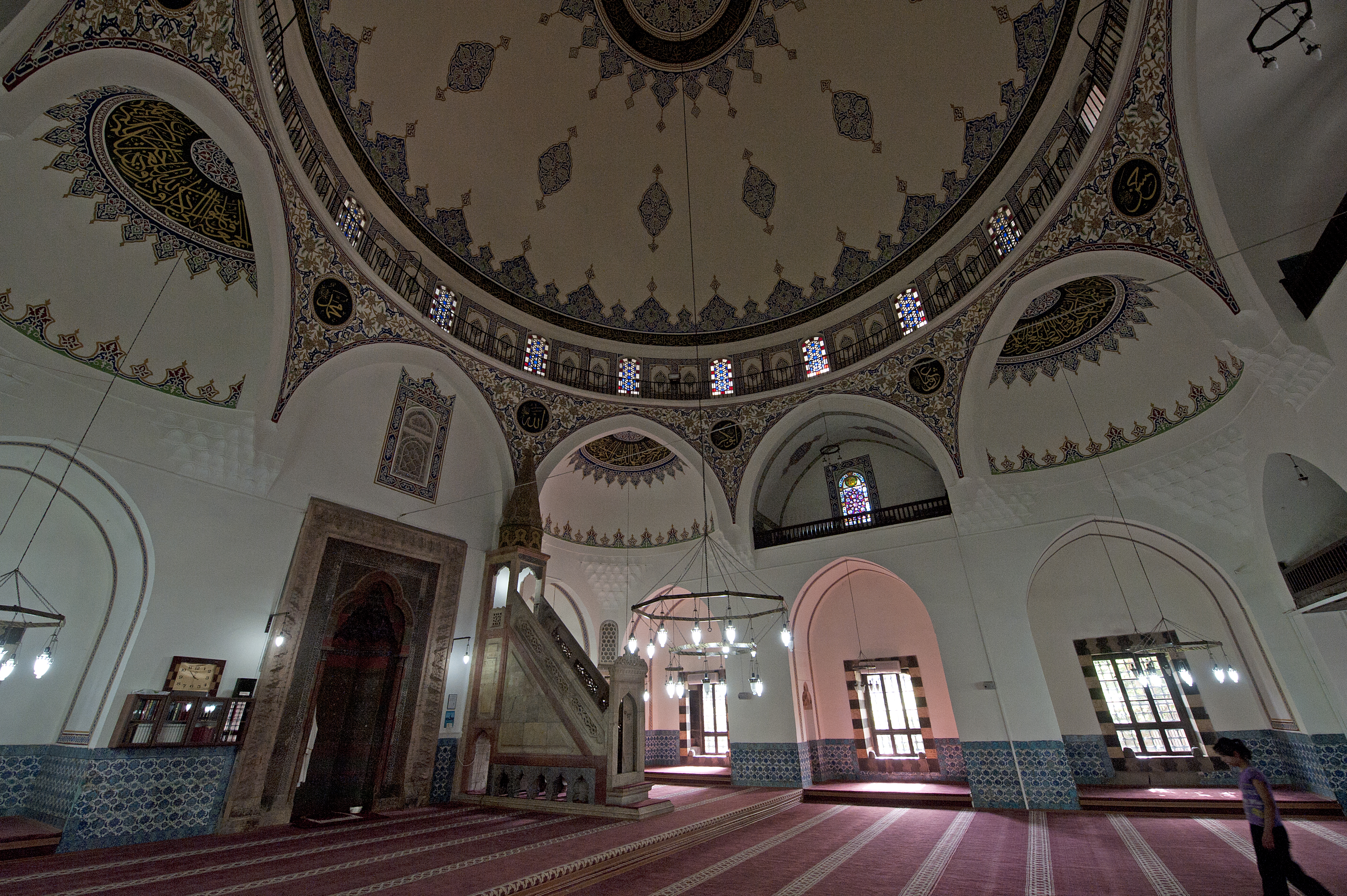
Interior of the mosque

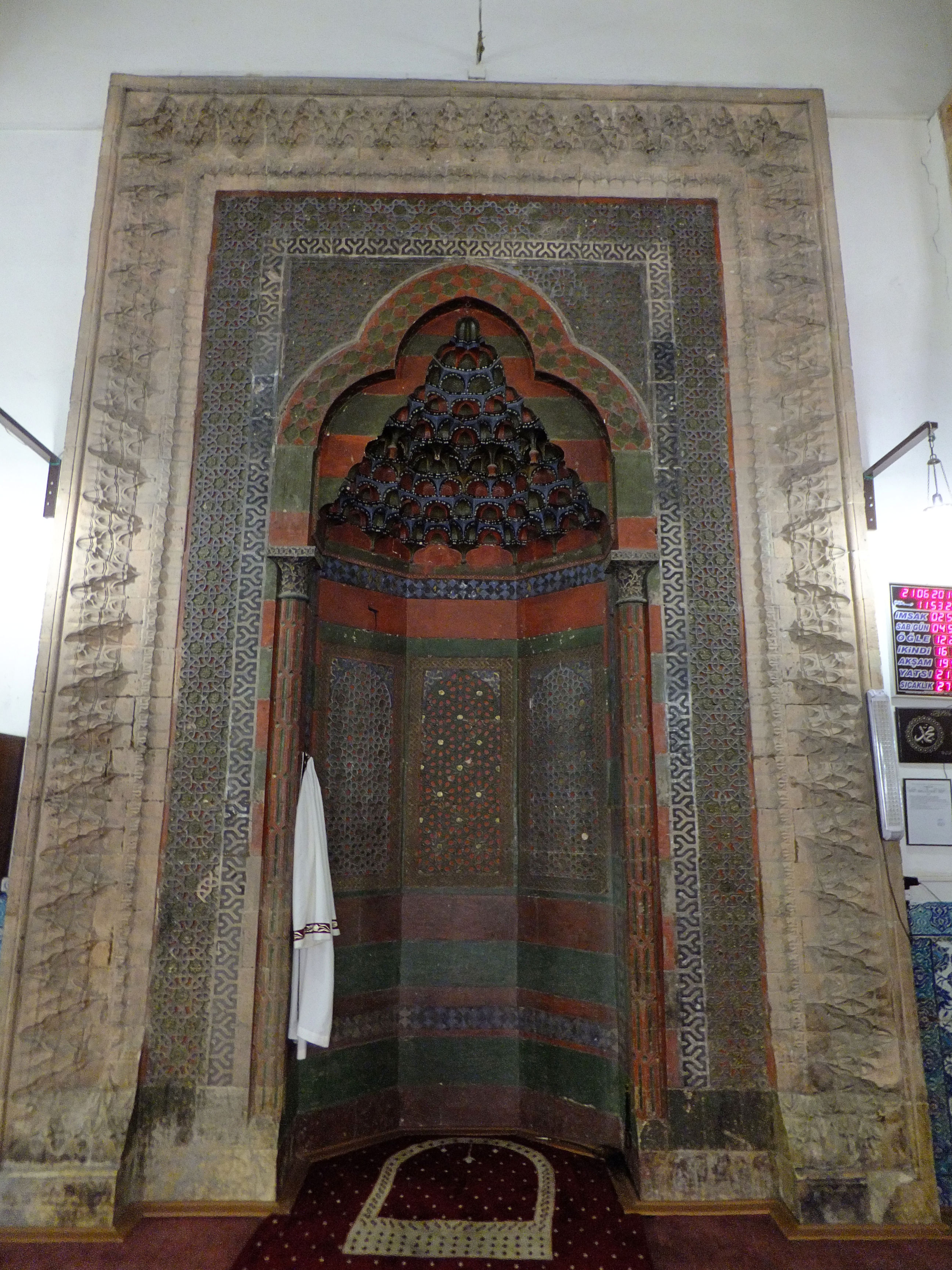
Mihrab of the mosque

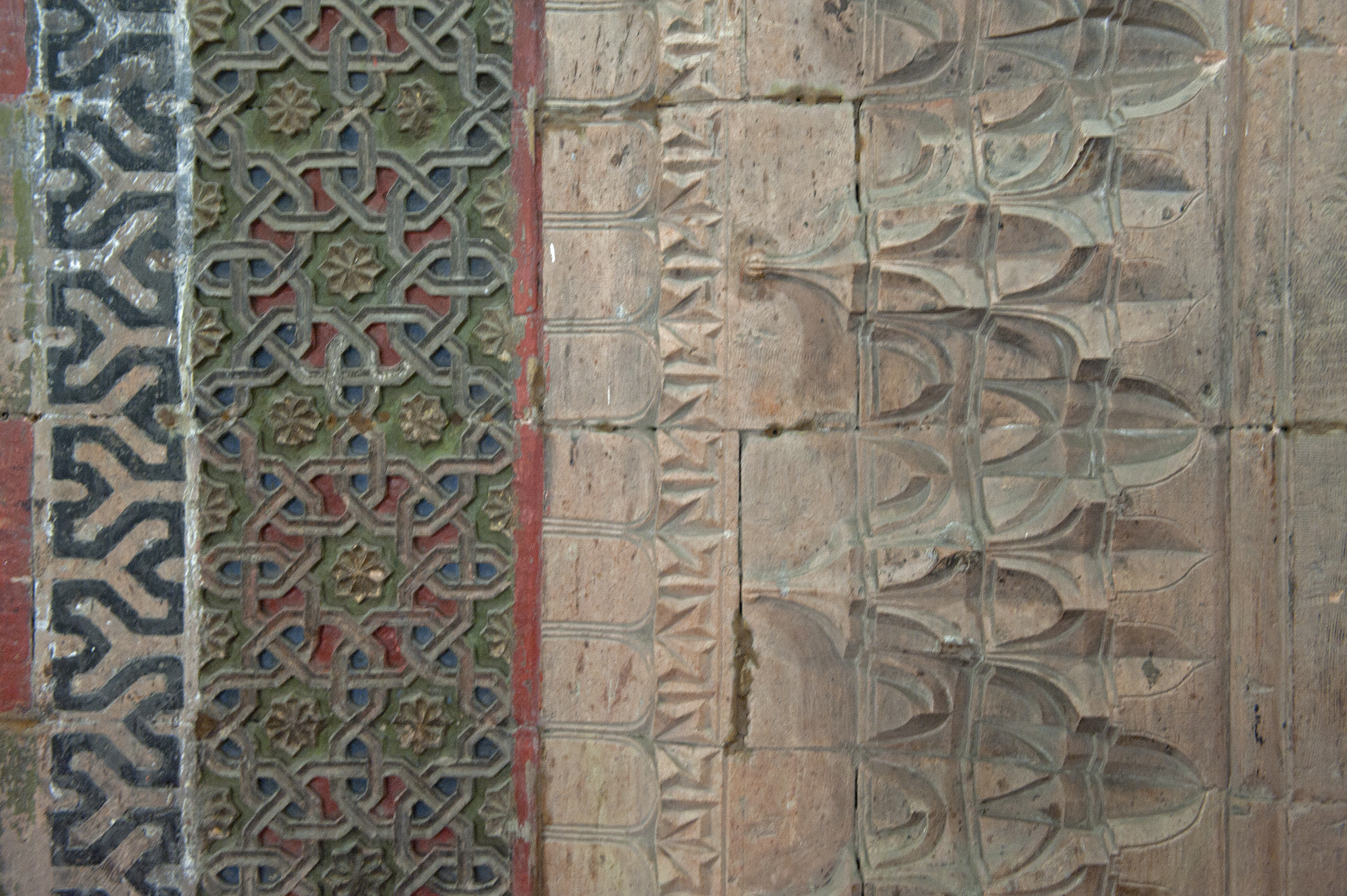
Detail of the mihrab's decoration

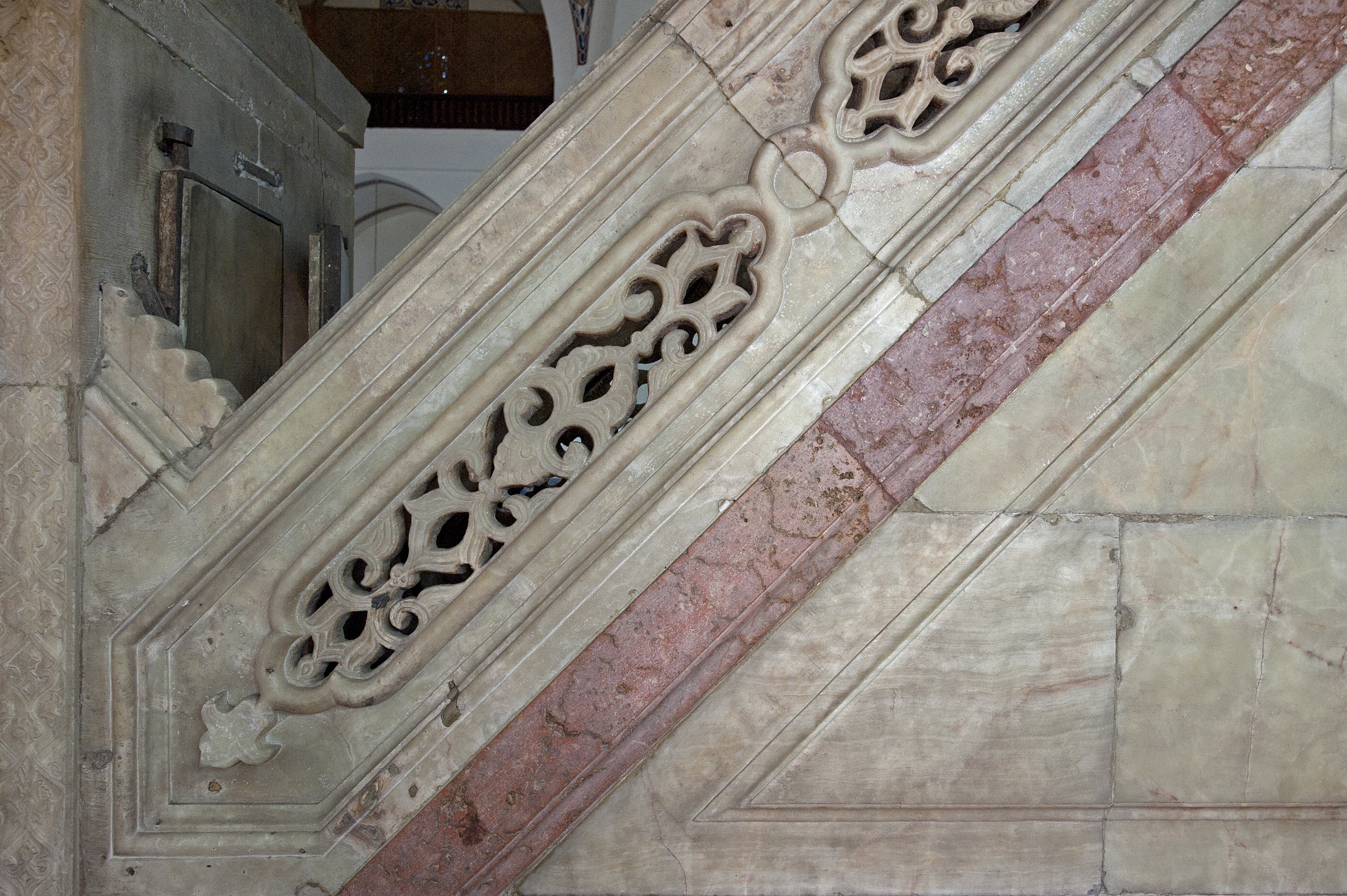
Detail of the mosque's stone minbar

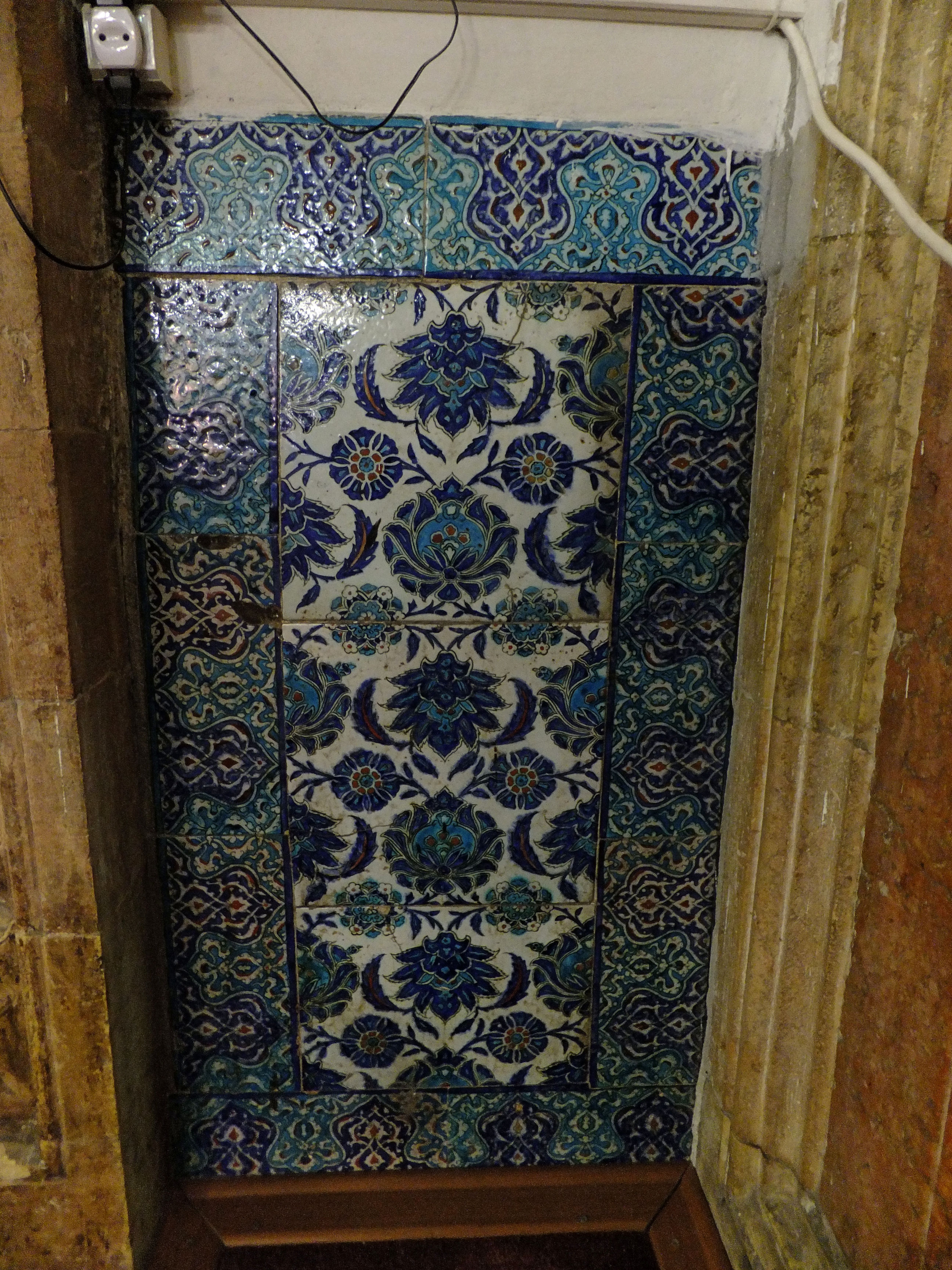
Some of the tilework decoration inside the mosque
