= Selimiye Mosque, Konya =

Mosque in Konya, Turkey

Selimiye Mosque
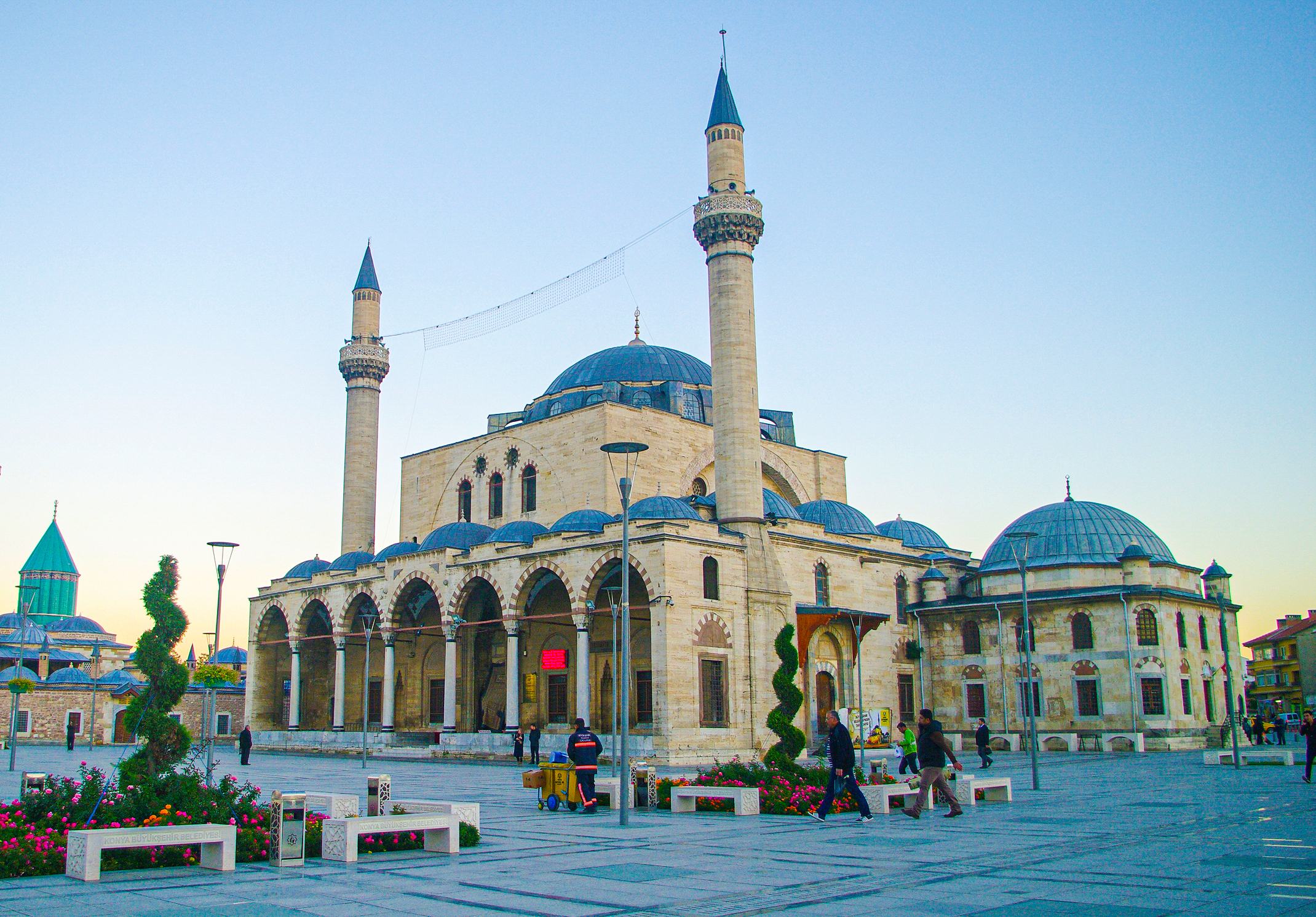

- Location of Konya within Turkey

Religion
- Affiliation: Islam
- Province: Konya Province
- Region: Central Anatolia
- Rite: Sunni Islam
- Status: Active

Location
- Location: Konya, Turkey
- Coordinates: 37.87044°N 32.50416°E

Architecture
- Type: Mosque
- Style: Classical Ottoman
- Completed: 1558
- Minaret: 2

Selimiye Mosque (Selim II Mosque, Turkish: Selimiye Camisi) is a 16th-century Ottoman mosque in Konya, Turkey.

== Location ==
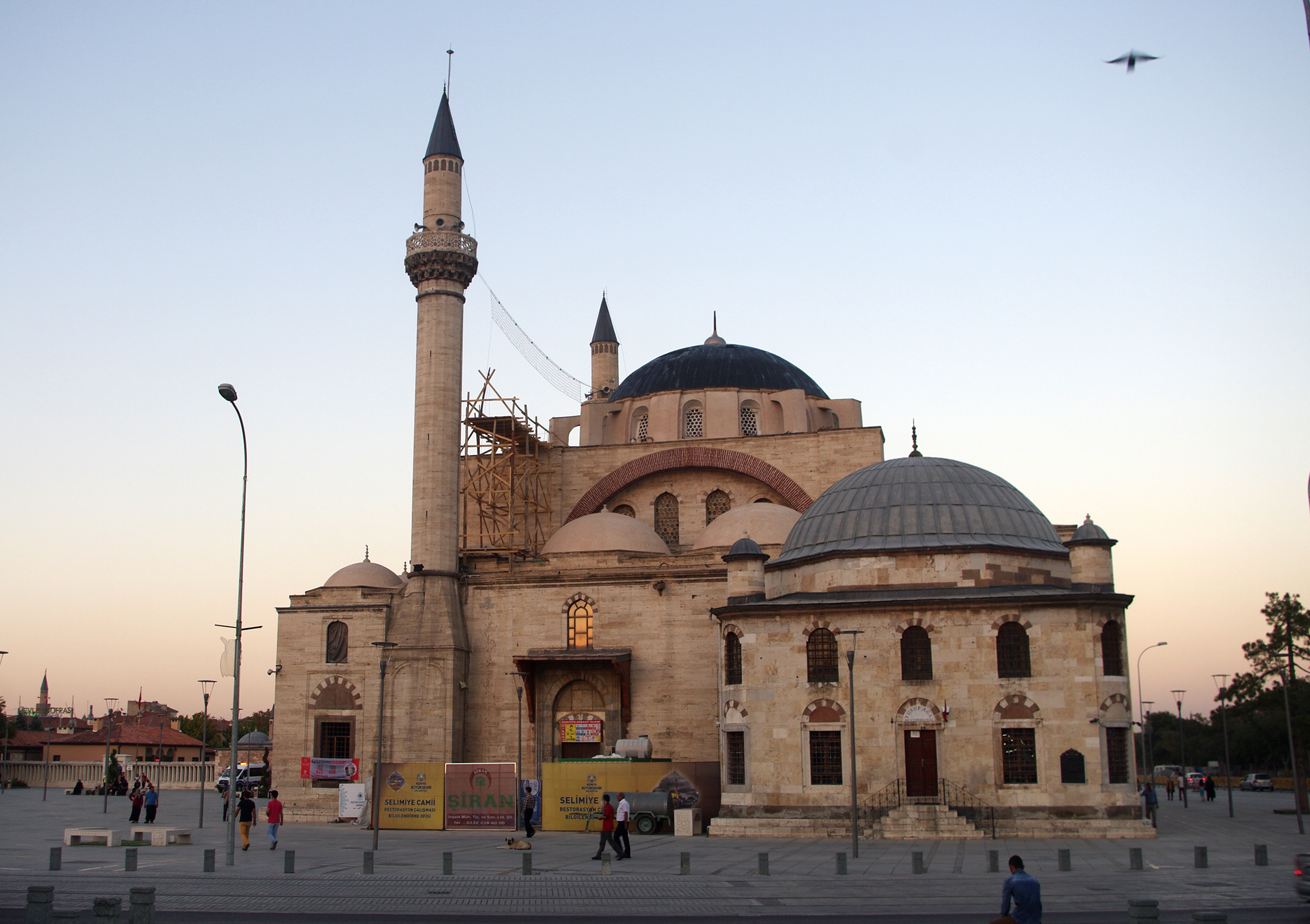
The domed library building attached to the mosque on the right is a later addition

The mosque is in the Karatay secondary municipality of Konya. It is situated in the business center of the city to the east of the Aziziye Mosque. The mosque was built next to the funerary shrine complex of Mevlana Celalüddin Rumi, a Persian sufi mystic (today the Mevlâna Museum).

== History ==
The mosque had been commissioned in 1558 by Selim II while he was still a şehzade (prince) working as a sanjak governor. Although the mosque was constructed while Mimar Sinan held the post of chief architect, the building is not listed in any of his autobiographies. In Konya Sinan only lists the renovation of a hospice. The construction was completed in 1570 after Selim became the sultan. Later it was repaired three times; in 1685, 1816 and 1914.

== Architecture ==
The double-minaret mosque is a typical 16th century Ottoman mosque and it resembles Fatih Mosque in Istanbul. The praying area is roofed by a big dome. There are seven small domes over the portico. The mihrab is made of blue marble and the minbar is made of white marble.

== Sources ==
- Necipoğlu, Gülru (2005). The Age of Sinan: Architectural Culture in the Ottoman Empire. London: Reaktion Books. ISBN 978-1-86189-253-9.
