= Sinan Pasha (Ottoman admiral) =

Ottoman admiral

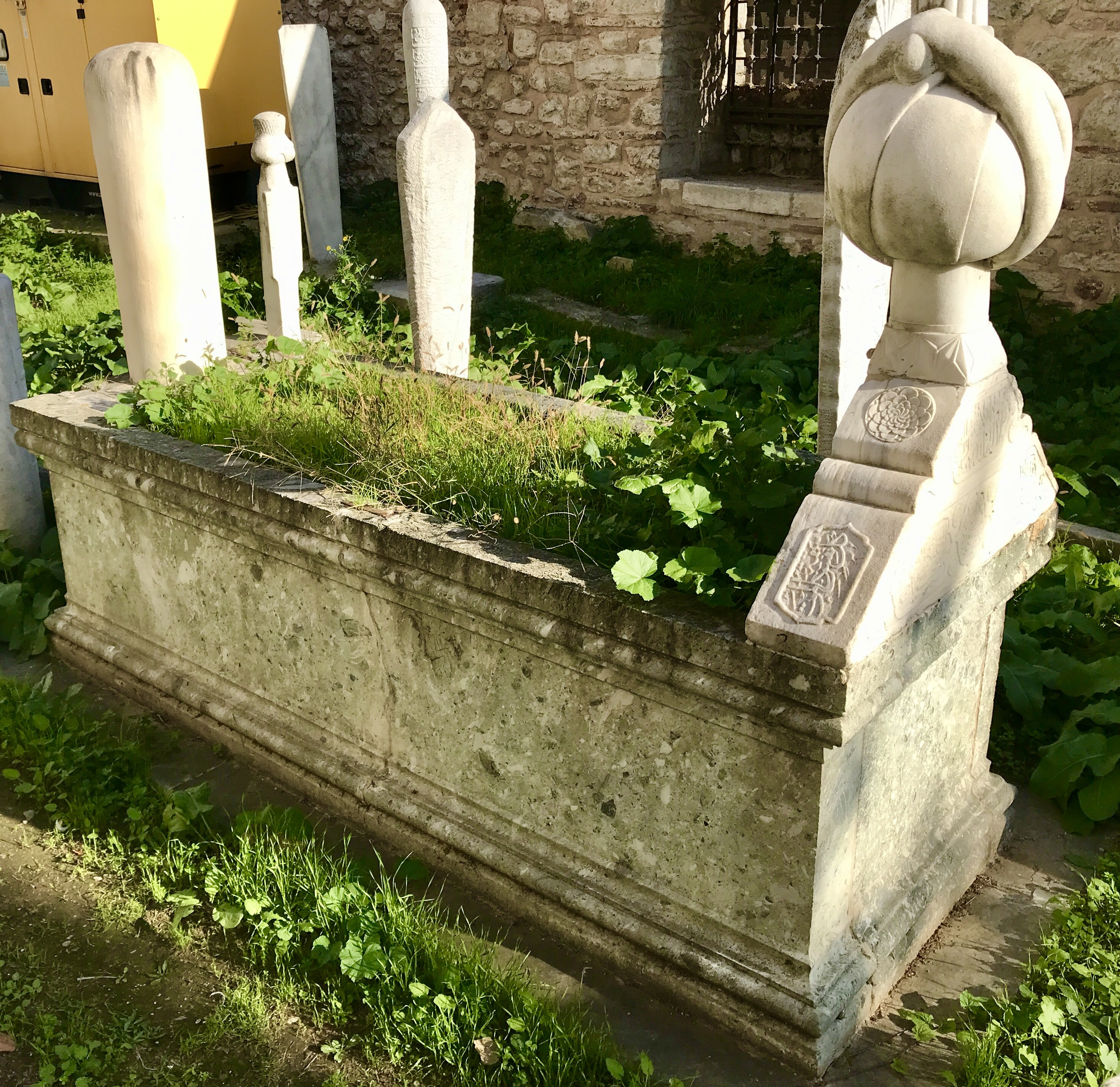
- Tomb of Ottoman Admiral Sinan Pasha, at the garden of Mihrimah Sultan Mosque in Üsküdar, Istanbul.

Kapudan Pasha of the Ottoman Empire
- In office 1550–1553
- Monarch: Suleiman I
- Preceded by: Sokollu Mehmed Pasha
- Succeeded by: Piyale Pasha

Personal details
- Died: 21 December 1553 Sultanahmet Square, Constantinople (now Istanbul), Ottoman Empire
- Resting place: Mihrimah Sultan Mosque, Üsküdar
- Relations: Rustem Pasha (brother)
- Children: 2 daughters and a son
- Ethnicity: Croat

Sinanuddin Yusuf Pasha or in short Sinan Pasha (Bosnian: Sinanudin Jusuf-paša or Sinan-paša; died 21 December 1553) was an Ottoman Grand Admiral (Kapudan Pasha), who served in the Ottoman Navy for nearly four years between 1550 and the end of 1553, during the reign of Suleiman the Magnificent. He was of Croatian descent, the predecessor of Piali Pasha in this rank and the brother of Grand Vizier Rustem Pasha, who in turn was married to Mihrimah Sultan, a daughter of Suleiman the Magnificent and Hurrem Sultan.

== Military campaigns ==
Sinan Pasha and Dragut collaborated on several naval expeditions in the Mediterranean Sea, particularly on the coasts of Italy and North Africa. Sinan was not an expert on naval affairs as much as Turgut Reis, who was a more popular commander among the admirals and captains of the navy, and this often caused conflict between the two. In an incident following the Ottoman conquest of Tripoli in 1551, the entire Ottoman fleet left Sinan Pasha on the shore and followed Turgut Reis into the Tyrrhenian Sea, declaring that they would accept only Turgut as their commander. Turgut Reis, however, considered this to be mutiny and treason and ordered them to return to take Sinan Pasha with them. Sinan through his career was symbolized as a good and smart naval strategist, and although not as powerful as Turgut Reis, he was one of Sultan Suleiman's favorite military strategists and good friend, as Sultan Suleiman had a very favorable view of the Bosnian Muslims.

Disturbed by this conflict, but favouring the talent of Turgut Reis, Sultan Suleiman ordered Sinan Pasha to "do whatever Turgut says." Most Ottoman seamen of that time, however, believed that Turgut Reis deserved the rank of Sinan Pasha.

== Characteristics ==
There are conflicting descriptions about Sinan Pasha's character, the majority say that he was tall and smart with a long beard and a cold gaze. The Ottoman historian Peçevî wrote that "Sinan Pasha was a proud and megalomaniac man who would not listen to the opinions and complaints of others. He had a cold gaze." However, Spanish historians of that period wrote that "Sinan Pasha was a tall and strong man with a truly handsome face and a gallant heart. He was also very kind."

== Death ==
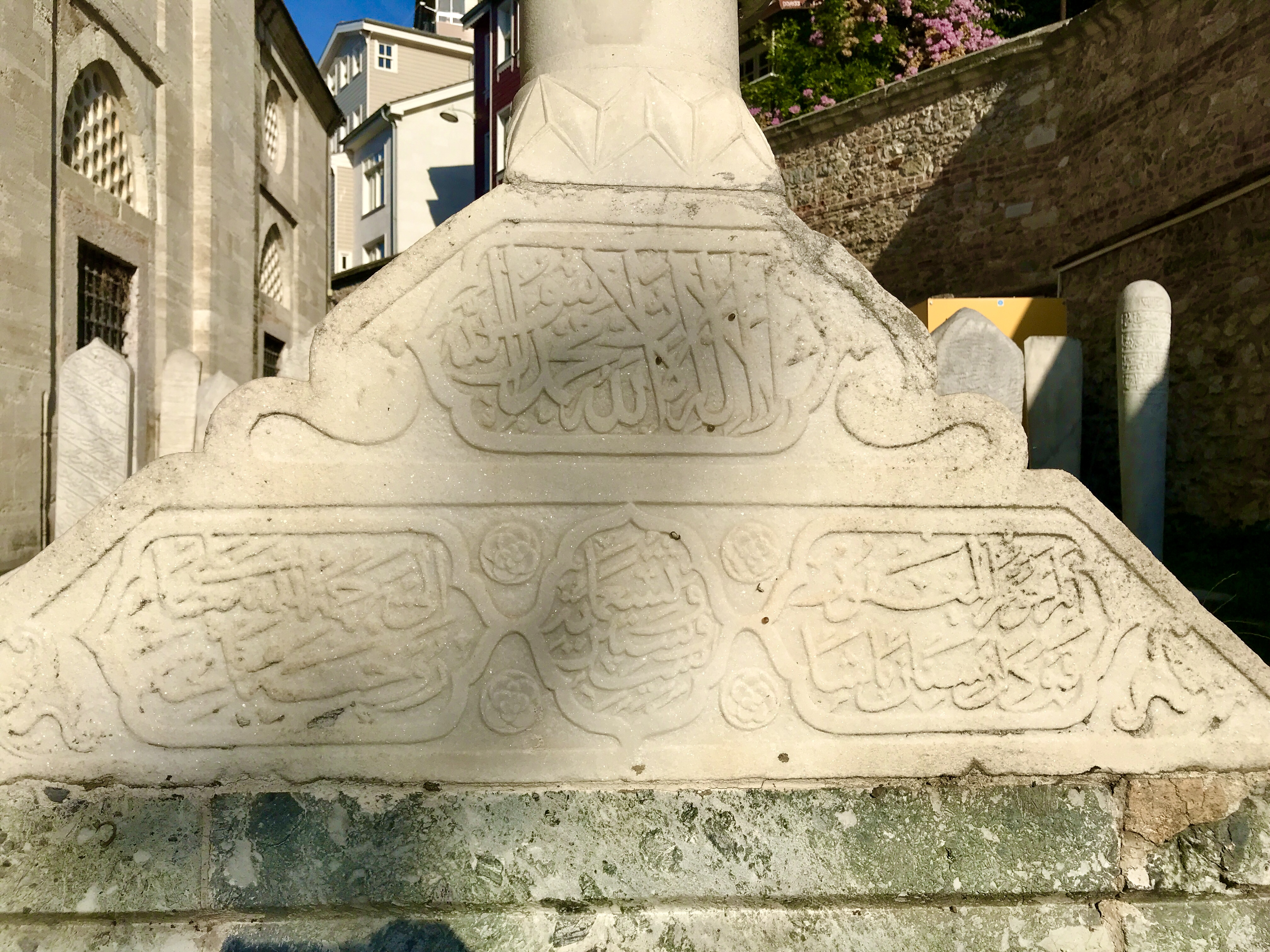
Headstone of Sinan Pasha.

Sinan Pasha died on 21 December 1553 in his palace which was located at the present Sultanahmet Square in Istanbul, and was later buried at the garden of Mihrimah Sultan Mosque in Üsküdar, which was designed by the great Ottoman architect Mimar Sinan.

Sinan Pasha had ordered the construction of a grand mosque with his name in the Beşiktaş district and wanted to be buried there, but the mosque could not be completed in time. Even though he had two daughters and a son, he left his entire fortune to Mihrimah Sultan (Sultana Mihrimah), the daughter of Sultan Suleiman and wife of his brother, Grand Vizier Rüstem Pasha.
