= Mihrimah Sultan Mosque =

Mihrimah Sultan Mosque may refer to:

- Mihrimah Sultan Mosque (Edirnekapı)
- Mihrimah Sultan Mosque (Üsküdar)
