= Sinan Pasha Mosque (Istanbul) =

Mosque in Beşiktaş, Istanbul, Turkey

- Sinan Paşa Camii
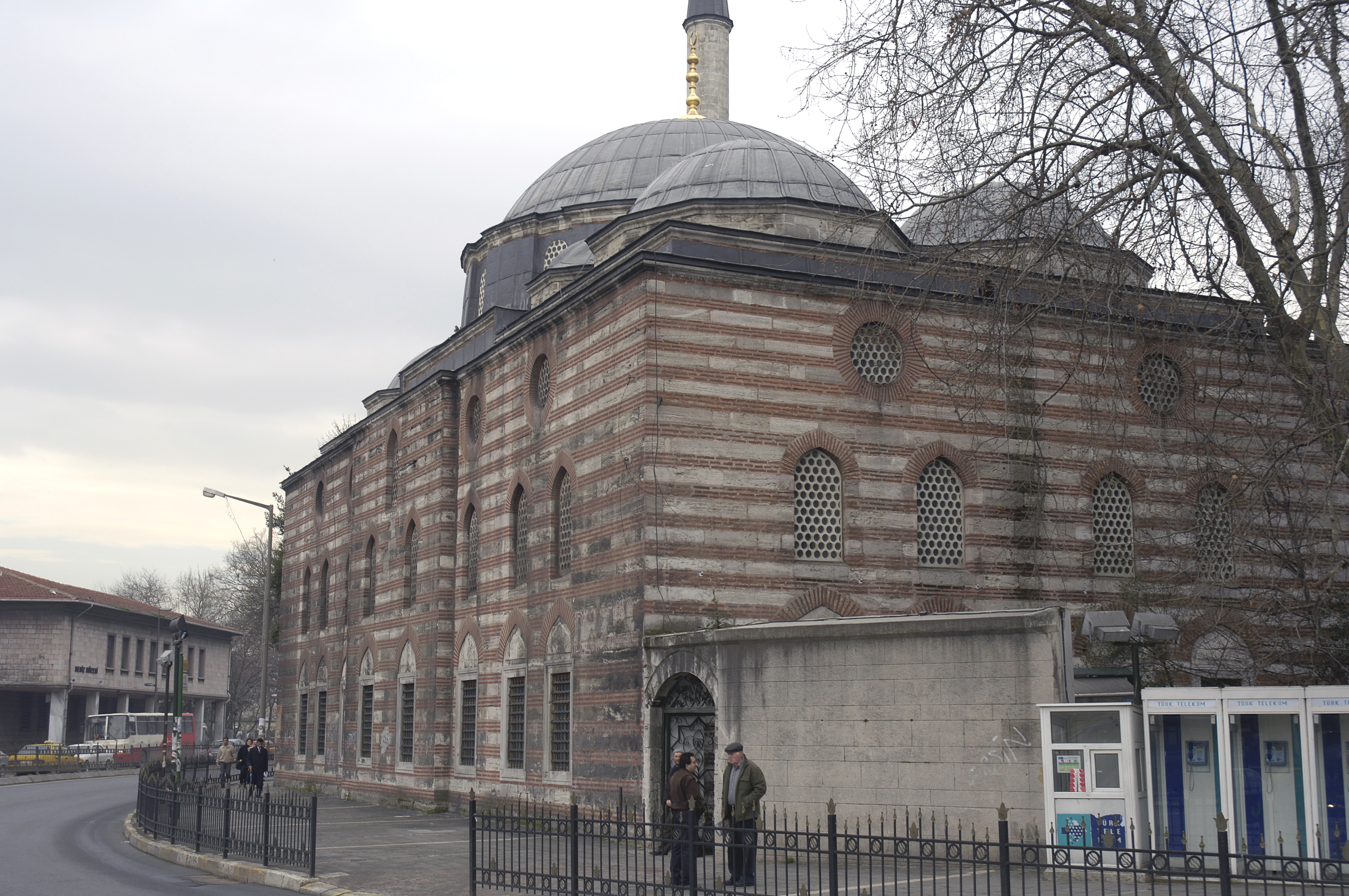

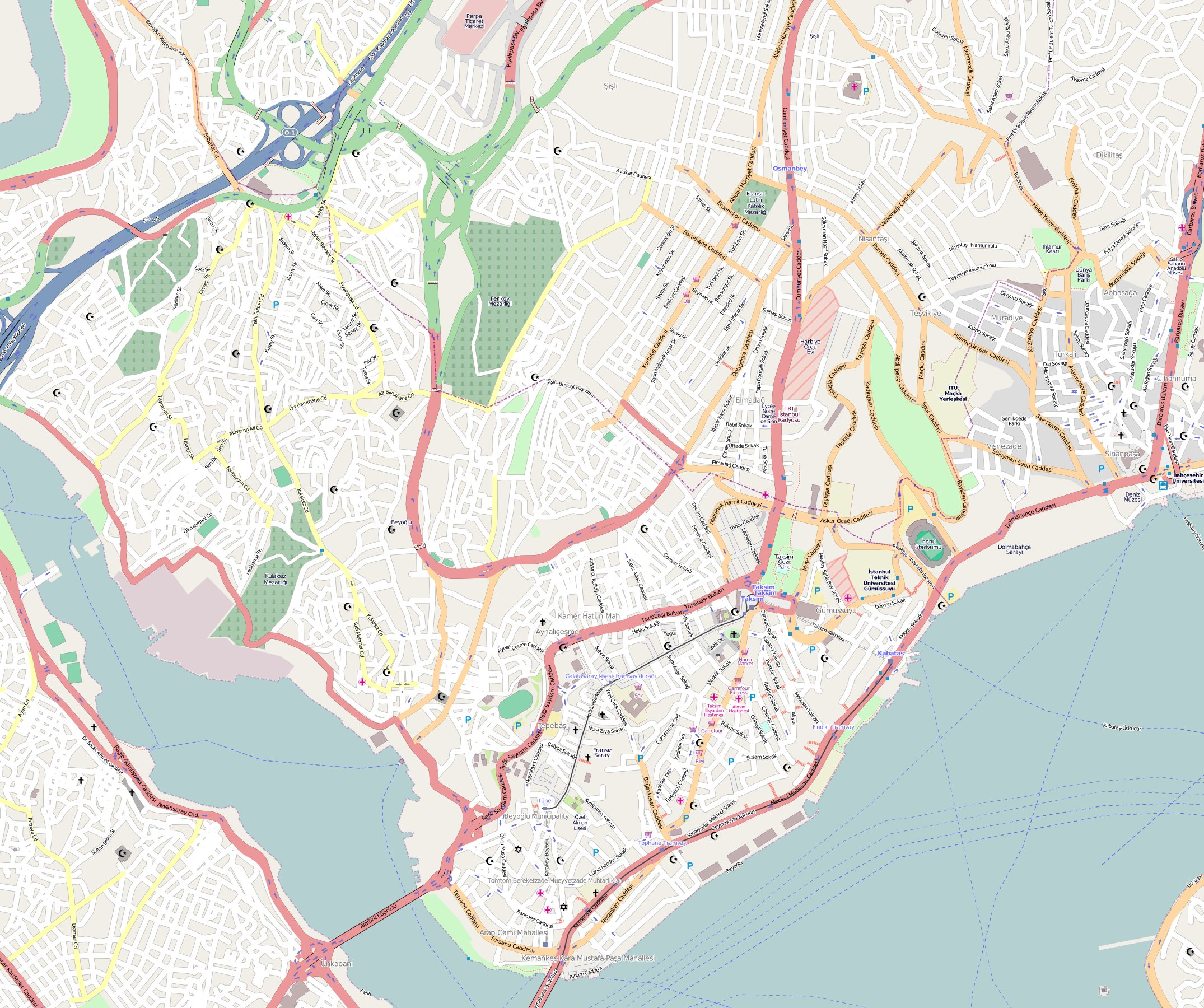
- Location within Beyoğlu district of Istanbul

Religion
- Affiliation: Islam

Location
- Location: Istanbul, Turkey
- Coordinates: 41.042343°N 29.006245°E

Architecture
- Architect: Mimar Sinan
- Type: Mosque
- Style: Ottoman architecture
- Groundbreaking: 1554
- Completed: 1555/56

Specifications
- Dome dia. (outer): 12.6 m (41 ft)
- Minaret: 1
- Materials: alternating layers of ashlar and brick

The Sinan Pasha Mosque (Turkish: Sinan Paşa Camii) is an Ottoman mosque located in a densely populated district of Beşiktaş, in Istanbul, Turkey. It was built by the Ottoman architect Mimar Sinan for the admiral Sinan Pasha. The türbe (tomb) of Barbaros Hayrettin Pasha is located just across the street.

== History ==
The mosque was endowed by the Ottoman admiral Sinan Pasha who was the younger brother of the grand vizier Rüstem Pasha. The mosque was designed by the imperial architect Mimar Sinan. Sinan Pasha died in 1554 and work began after his death. The gilded Arabic foundation inscription above the arched gateway of the mosque records the completion date as November/December 1555. The Turkish inscription carved around the white marble fountain basin in the courtyard records the date as 1555–56.

== Architecture ==
The forecourt of the mosque is surrounded on three sides by the madrasa. This has a shed roof supported on short columns and lacks a classroom. At the centre of the courtyard is a rectangular drinking fountain. The mosque is constructed of alternating layers of ashlar and brick. The north side of the mosque originally had a double portico but in 1749 the inner portico with five domes was incorporated into the prayer hall. The 12.6 metres (41 ft) dome is supported on six arches with two free-standing hexagonal piers. The original painted decoration has not survived. The simple minbar is made of white marble. The bath-house, which formed part of the original endowment, was demolished in 1957.

The design of the Sinan Pasha Mosque has been compared with the earlier Üç Şerefeli Mosque in Edirne which dates from 1437 to 1448. In both mosques a dome is supported on six arches with two free-standing piers.

== Gallery ==
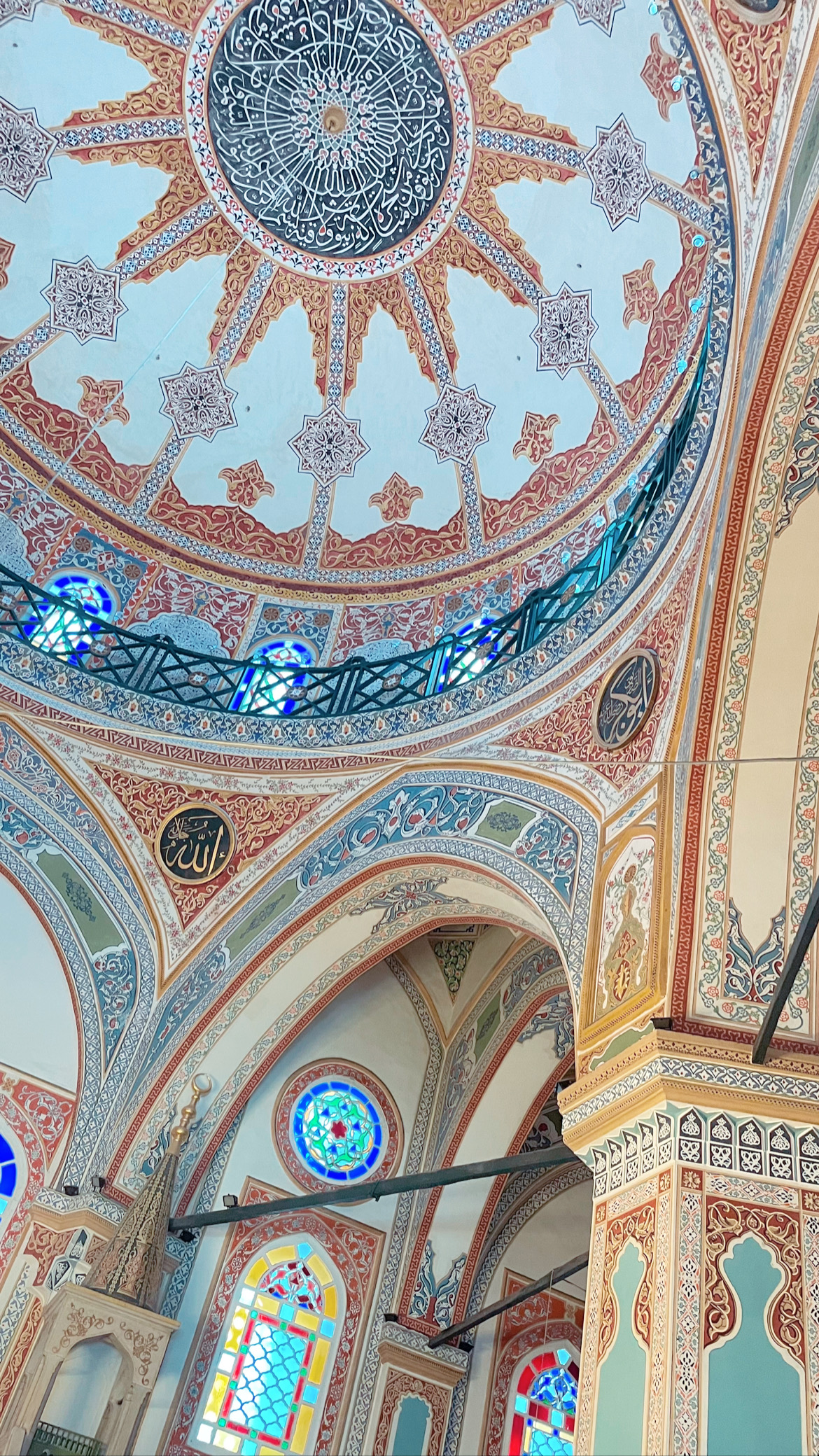

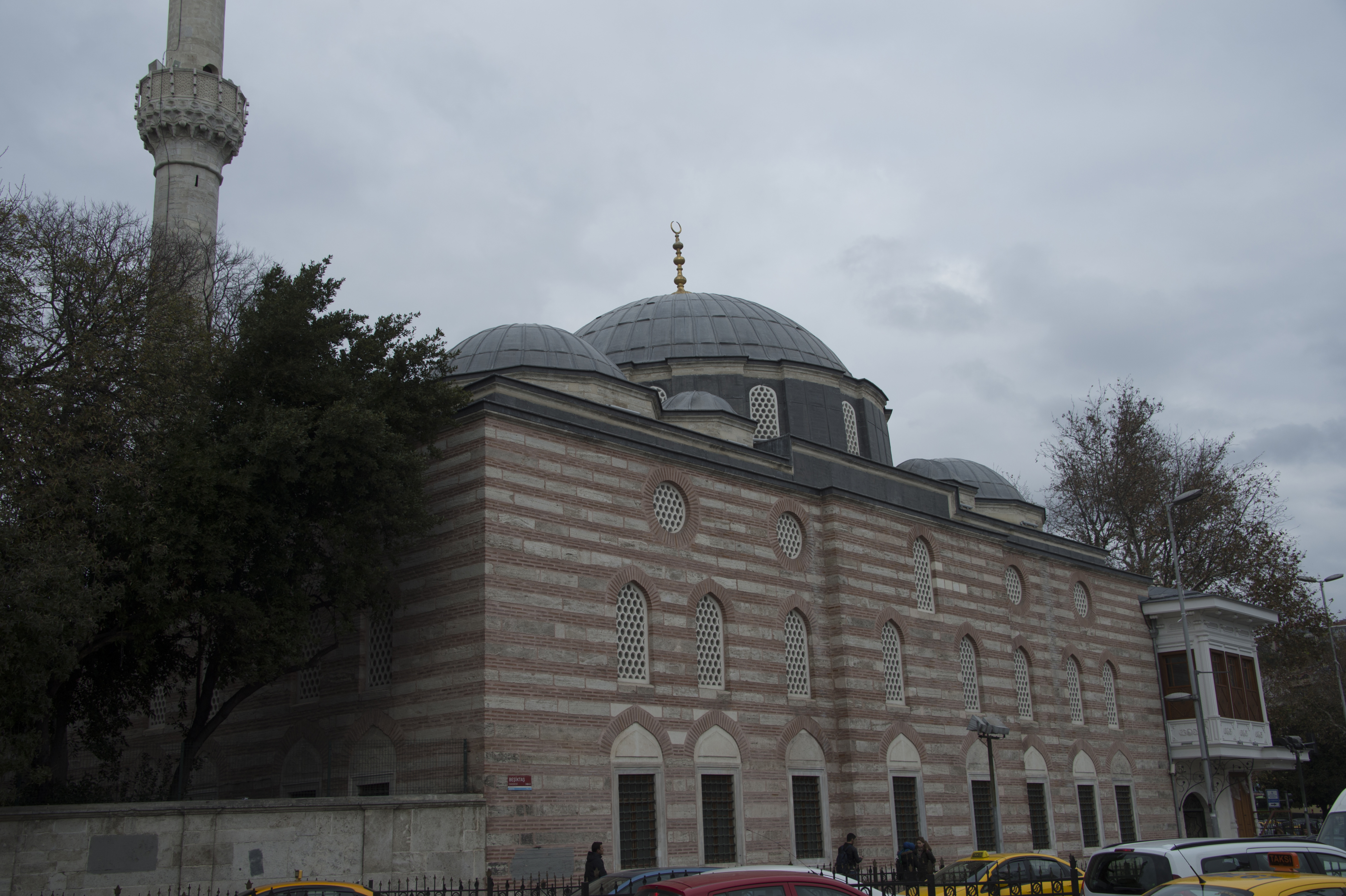
Sinan Pasha Mosque exterior from southwest

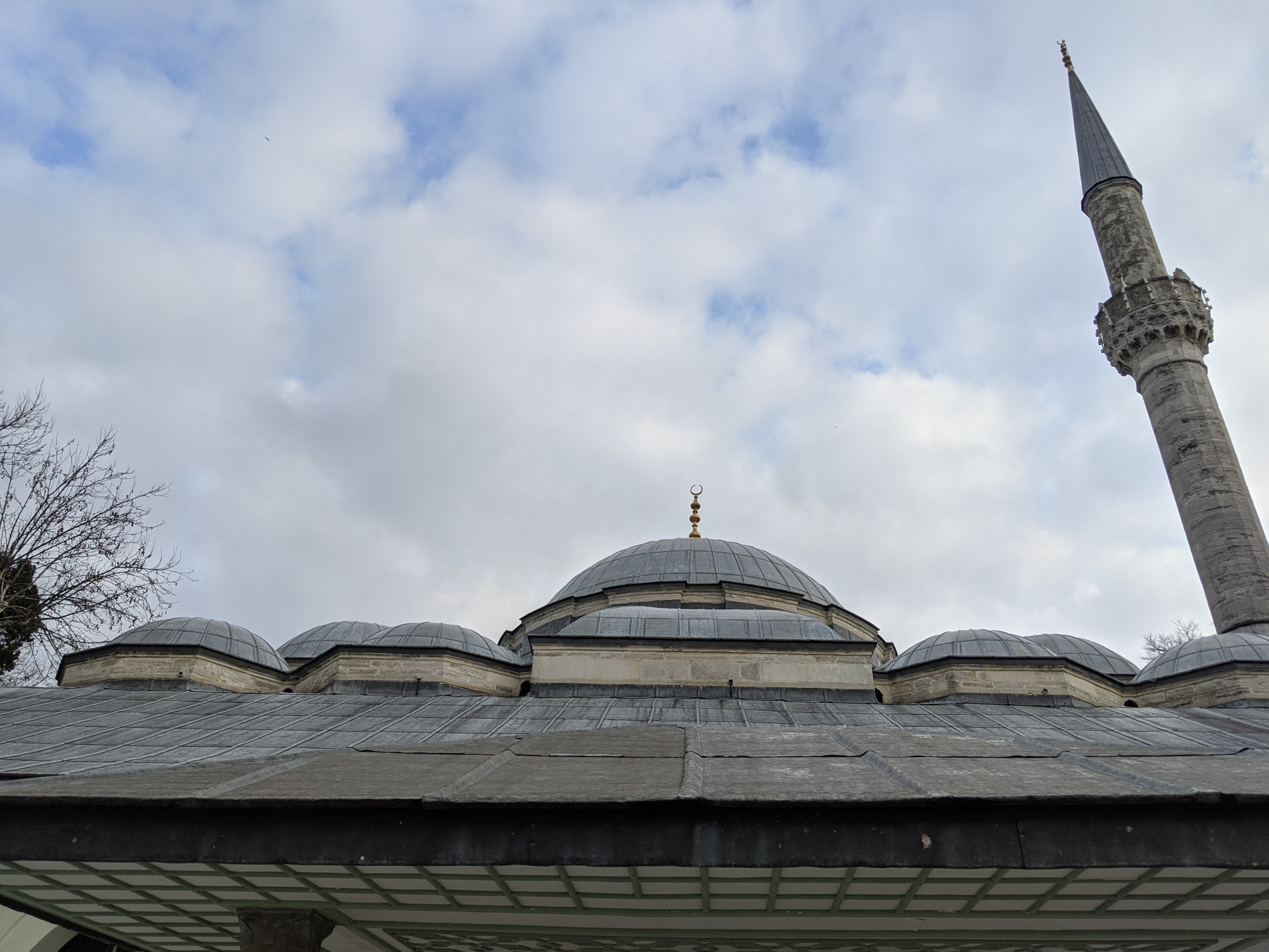
Domes and minaret

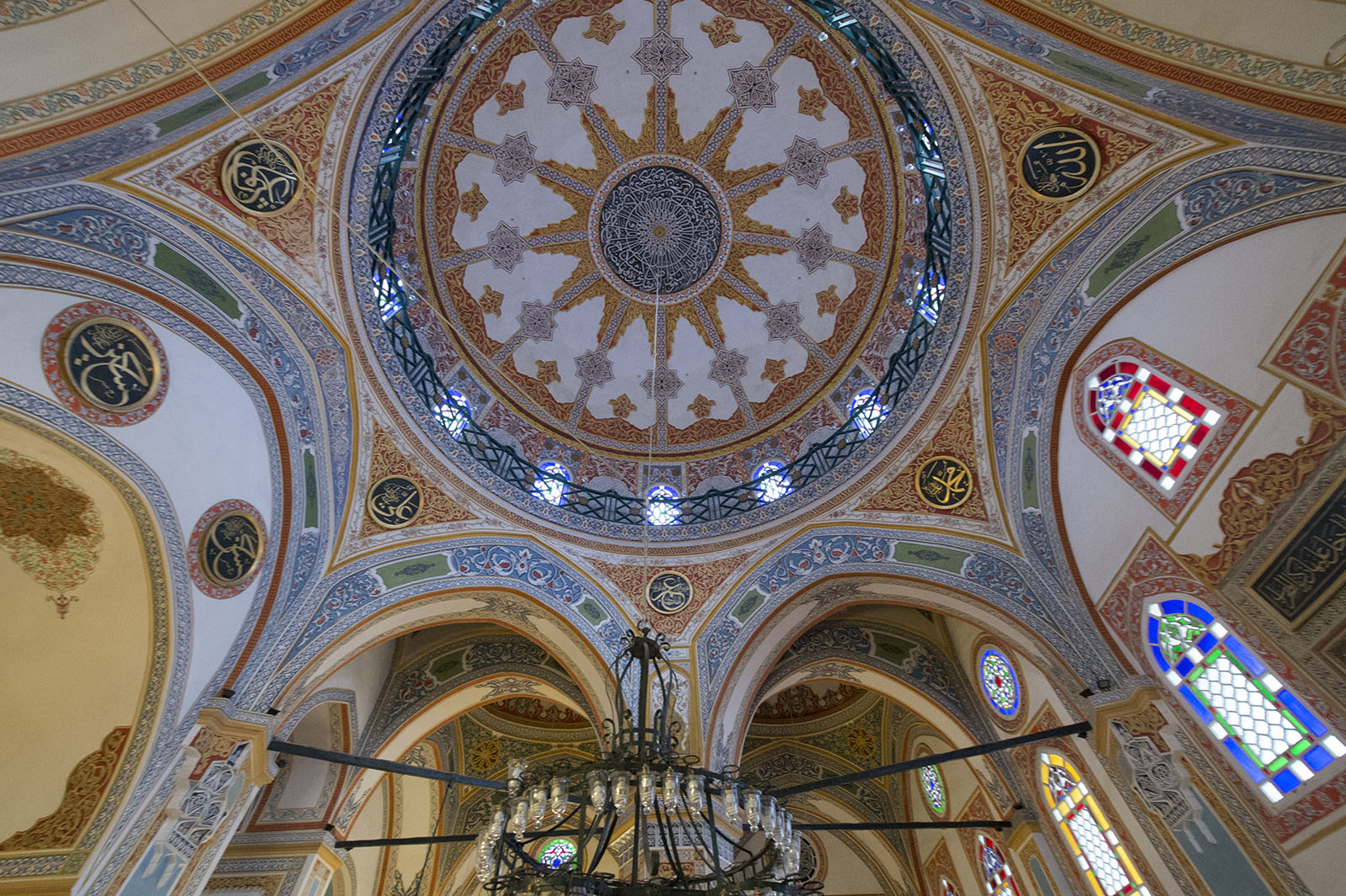
Sinan Pasha Mosque interior

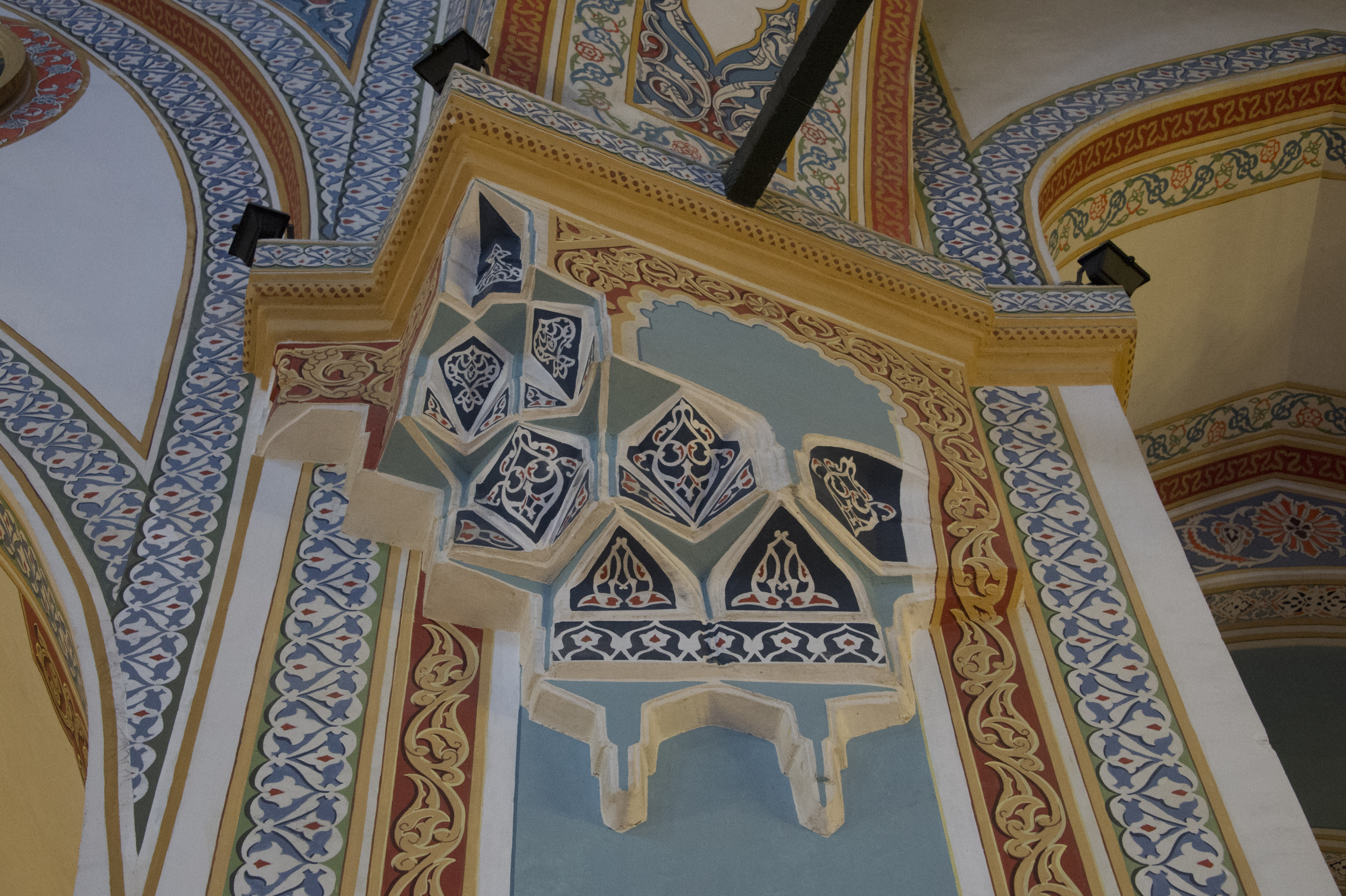
Sinan Pasha Mosque interior

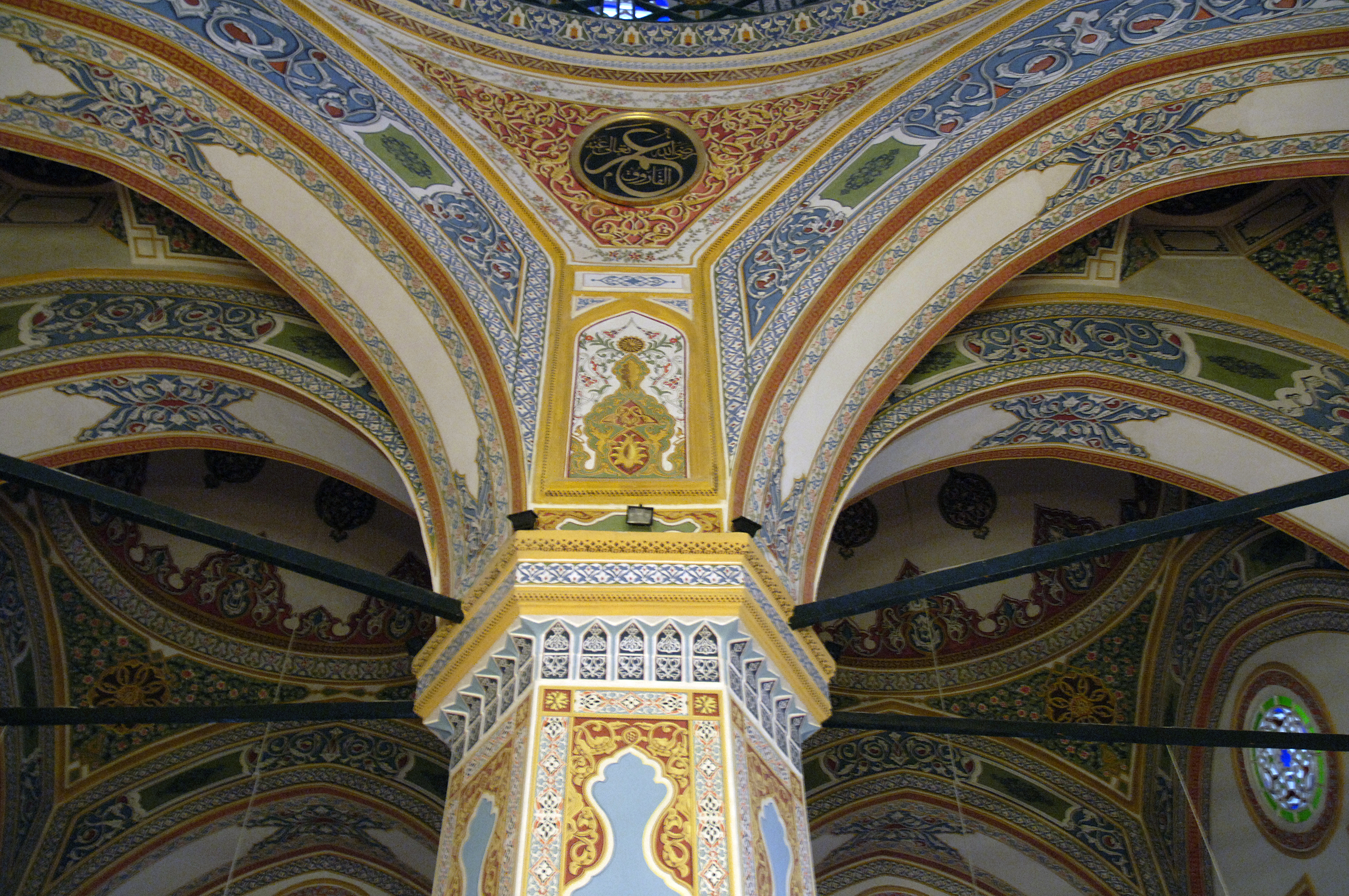
Sinan Pasha Mosque interior

== See also ==
- List of Friday mosques designed by Mimar Sinan
- List of mosques in Istanbul

== Sources ==
- Goodwin, Godfrey (2003) [1971]. A History of Ottoman Architecture. London: Thames & Hudson. ISBN 978-0-500-27429-3.
- Necipoğlu, Gülru (2005). The Age of Sinan: Architectural Culture in the Ottoman Empire. London: Reaktion Books. ISBN 978-1-86189-253-9.
