= Mihrimah Sultan Mosque, Üsküdar =

16th century Turkish mosque

Mihrimah Sultan Mosque
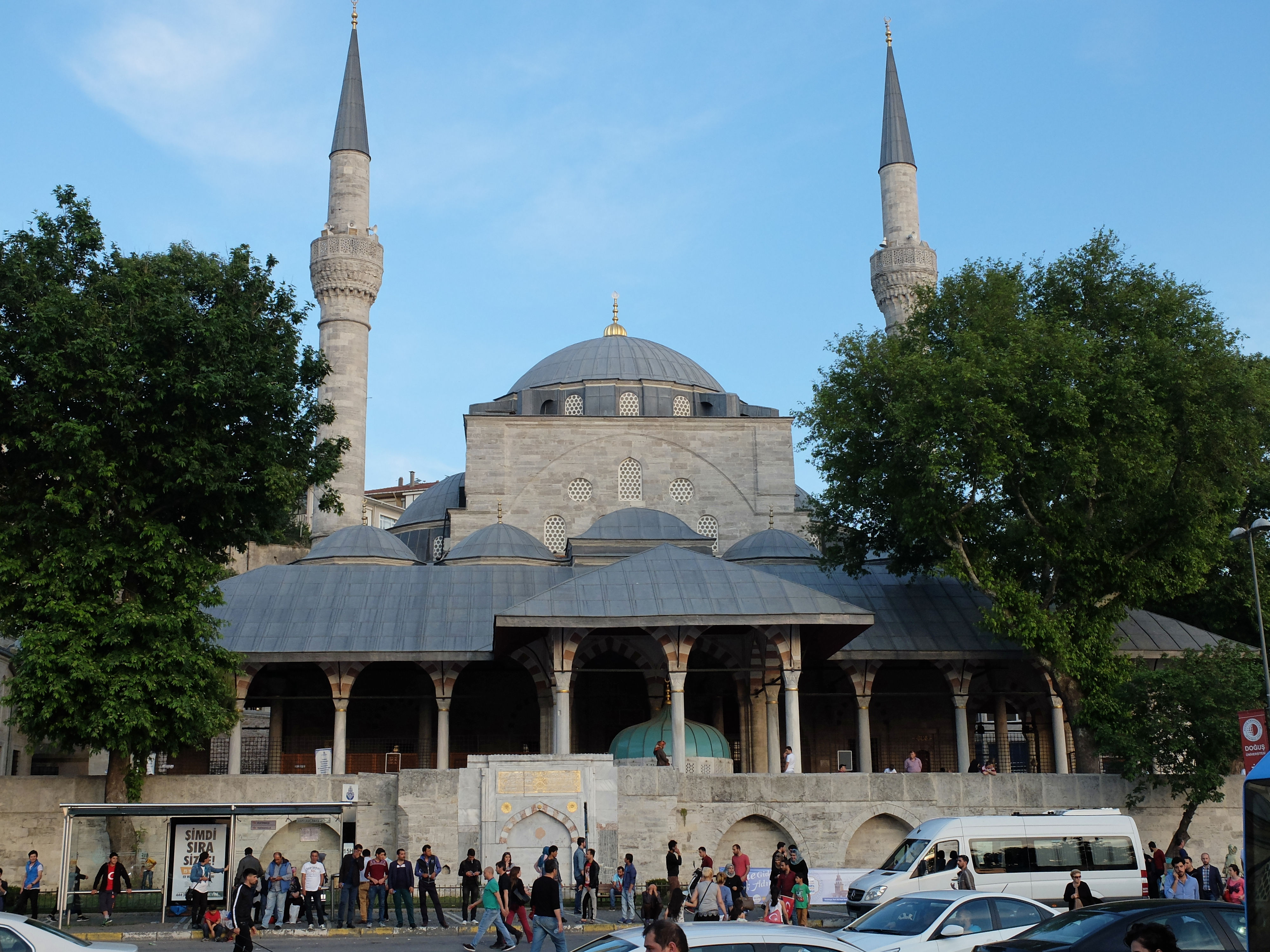

- Location within Istanbul

Religion
- Affiliation: Sunni Islam

Location
- Location: Istanbul, Turkey
- Coordinates: 41°01′36″N 29°00′58″E

Architecture
- Architect: Mimar Sinan
- Type: Mosque
- Groundbreaking: c. 1543-44
- Completed: 1548

Specifications
- Dome height (outer): 24.2 m (79 ft)
- Dome dia. (outer): 11.4 m (37 ft)
- Minaret: 2
- Materials: ashlar

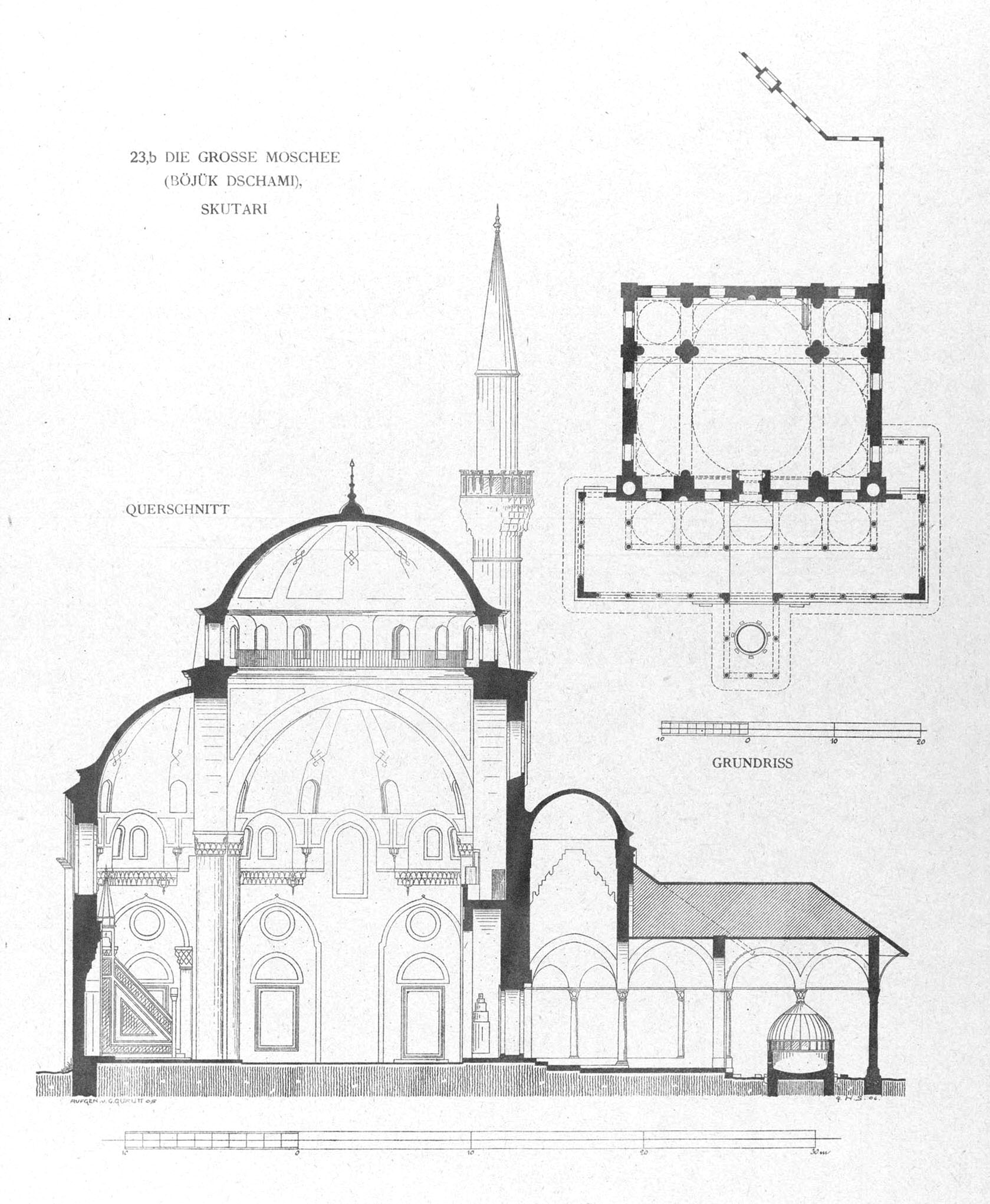
Cross section and plan, Cornelius Gurlitt, 1912

The Mihrimah Sultan Mosque (İskele Mosque, Jetty Mosque, Turkish: Mihrimah Sultan Camii, İskele Camii) is a 16th century Ottoman mosque overlooking the waterfront in the historic center of the Üsküdar district of Istanbul, Turkey. One of Üsküdar's best-known landmarks, it takes its alternative name from the ferry terminal near which it stands. Before the coast road was built, the mosque would have stood right beside the water, accessible by boat.

== History ==
The mosque was designed by the imperial architect Mimar Sinan and built between 1543–44 and 1548. It is the earlier of the two Friday mosques in Istanbul commissioned by Mihrimah Sultan, daughter of Sultan Suleiman the Magnificent and wife of Grand Vizier Rüstem Pasha. The first mosque with this name was built in the Asian part (Üsküdar) and the second on the European side. The two mosques, despite being on different continents, look at one another.

== Architecture ==
The large mosque stands on a raised platform with a broad double portico that contains a fine marble ablutions fountain. The architecture features several hallmarks of Mimar Sinan's mature style: a spacious, high-vaulted basement, slender minarets and a single-domed baldacchino flanked by three semi-domes ending in three exedrae.

The exterior is composed of ashlar, a thin dressed stone of gray to cream color. The interior walls and mimber are of Imported marble surrounds.

One of the minarets still bears a carved sundial.

It was originally part of a complex, parts of which also survive although they now have different purposes.

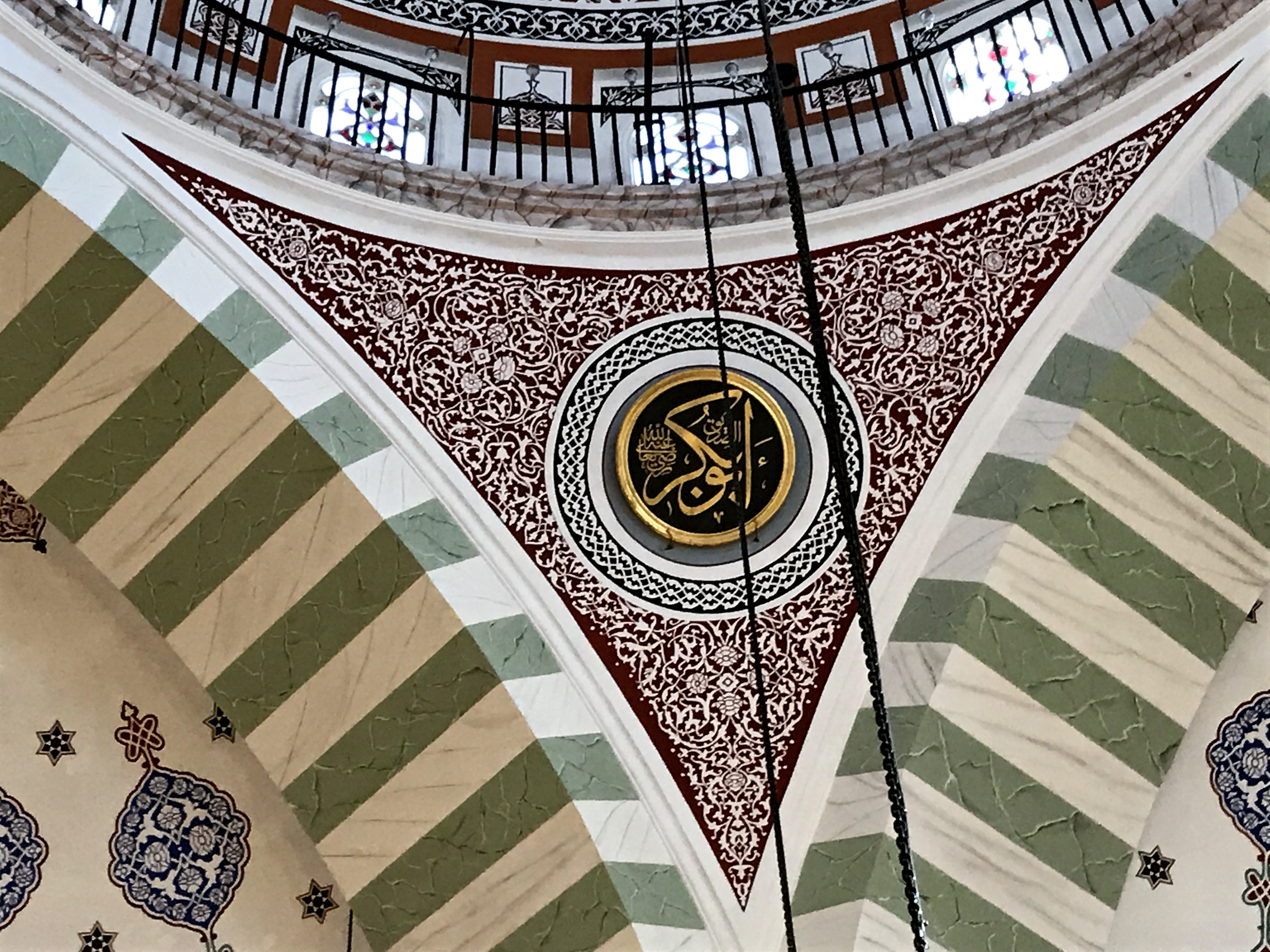
Islamic Calligraphy in the Mihrimah Sultan Mosque

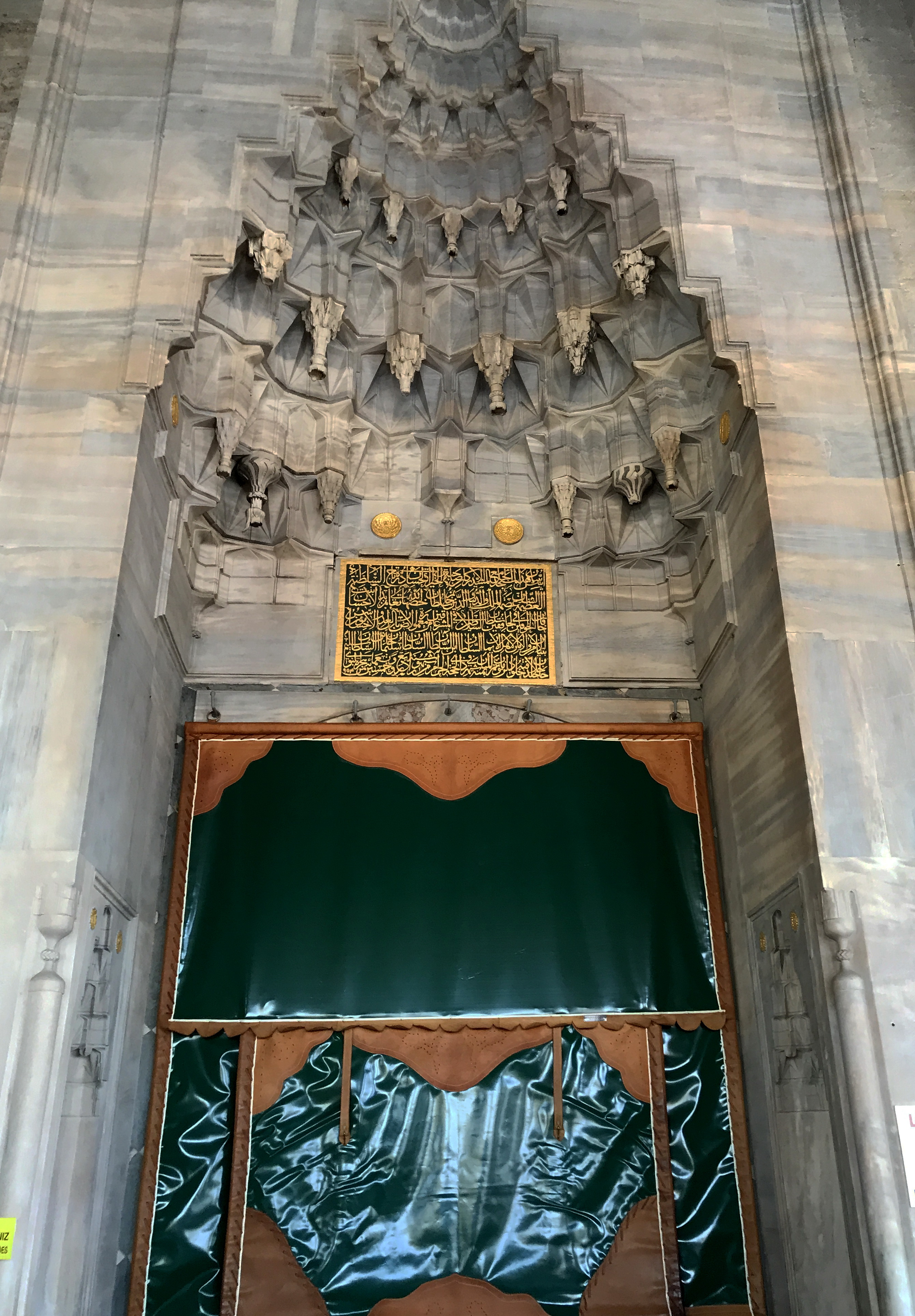
Muqarnas on top of the Mihrab inside the Mihrimah Sultan Mosque

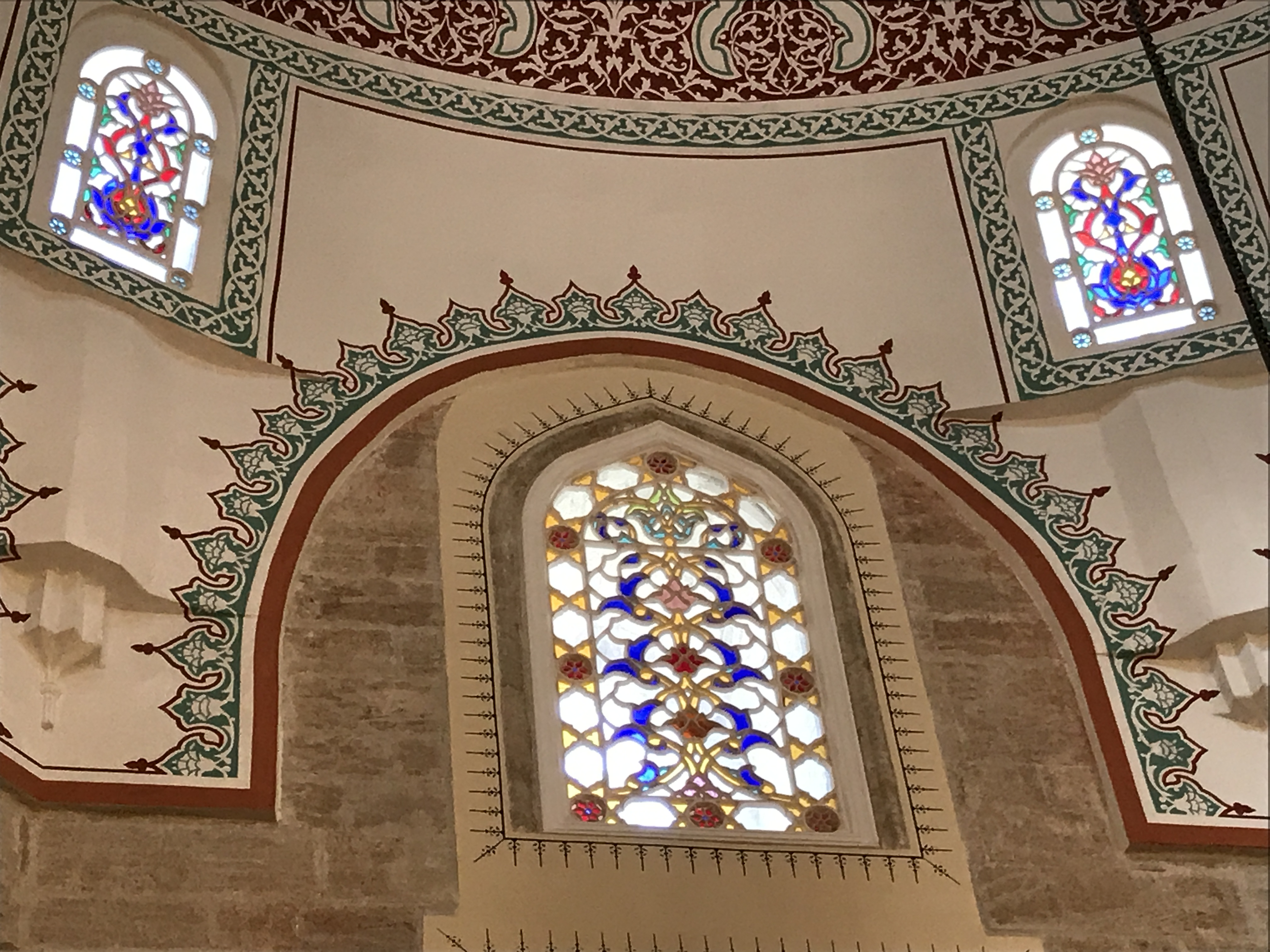
Flower mosaics displayed on the windows of the Mihrimah Sultan Mosque

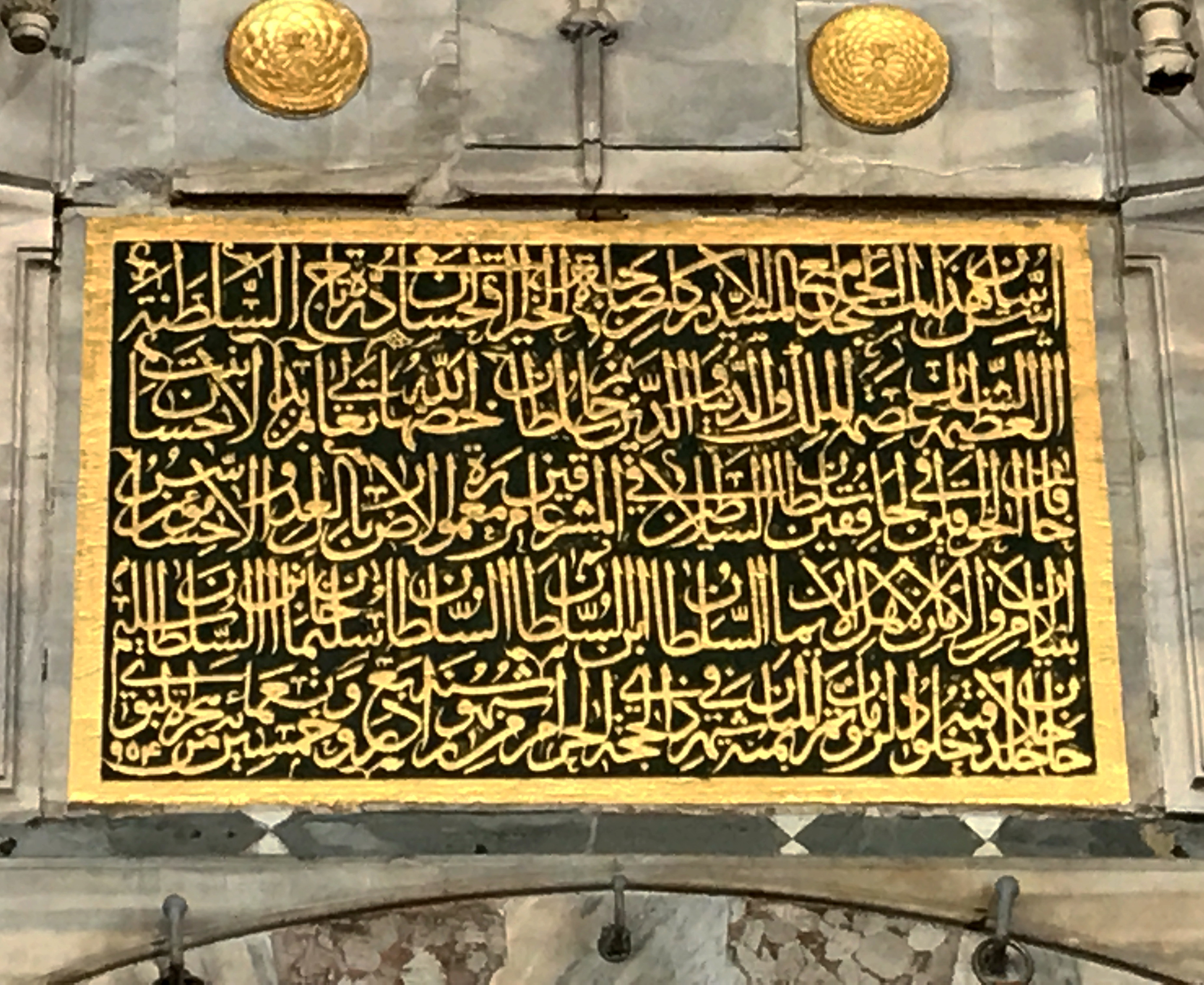
Islamic Calligraphy at the Mihrimah Sultan Mosque

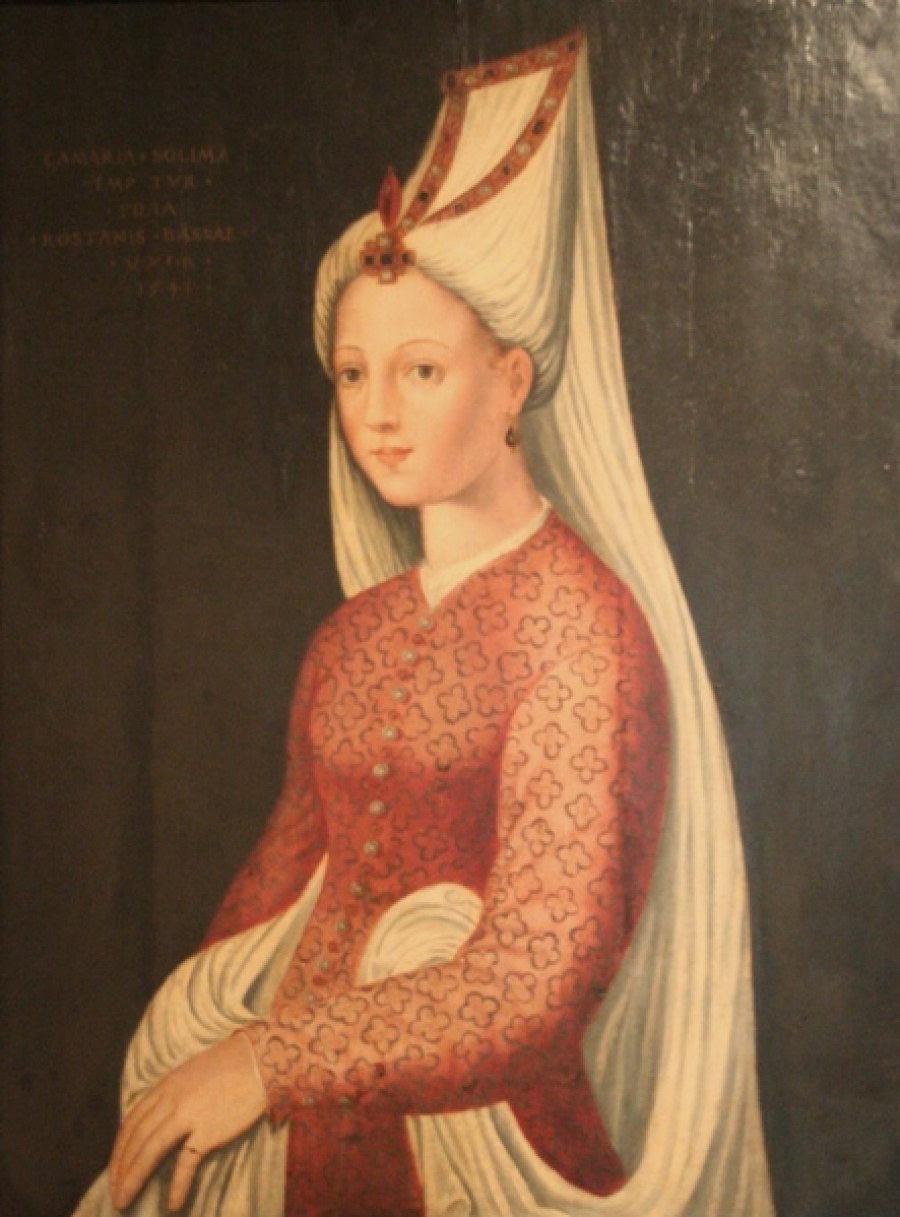
Mihrimah Sultan

== Gallery ==
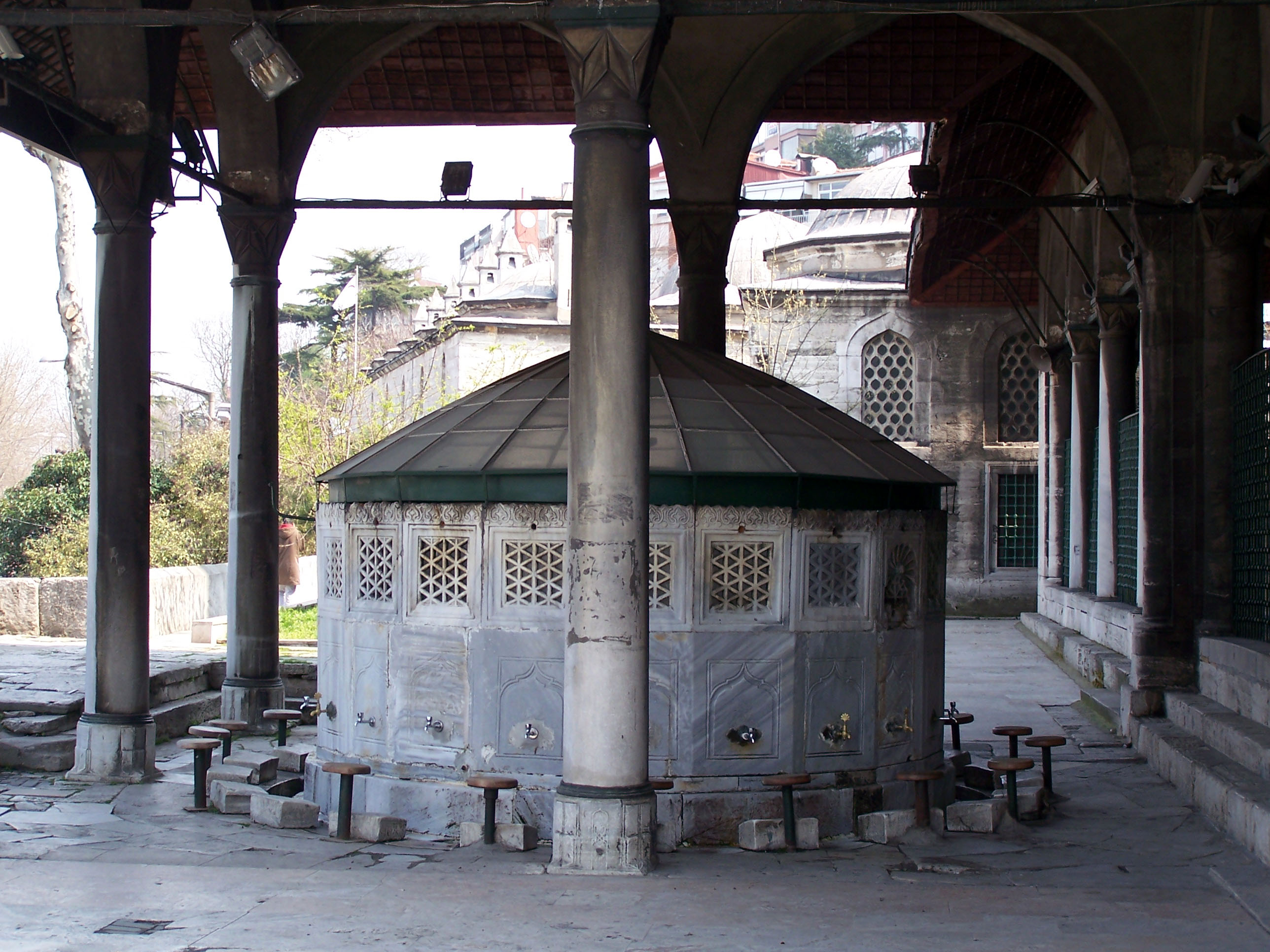
Ablution fountain

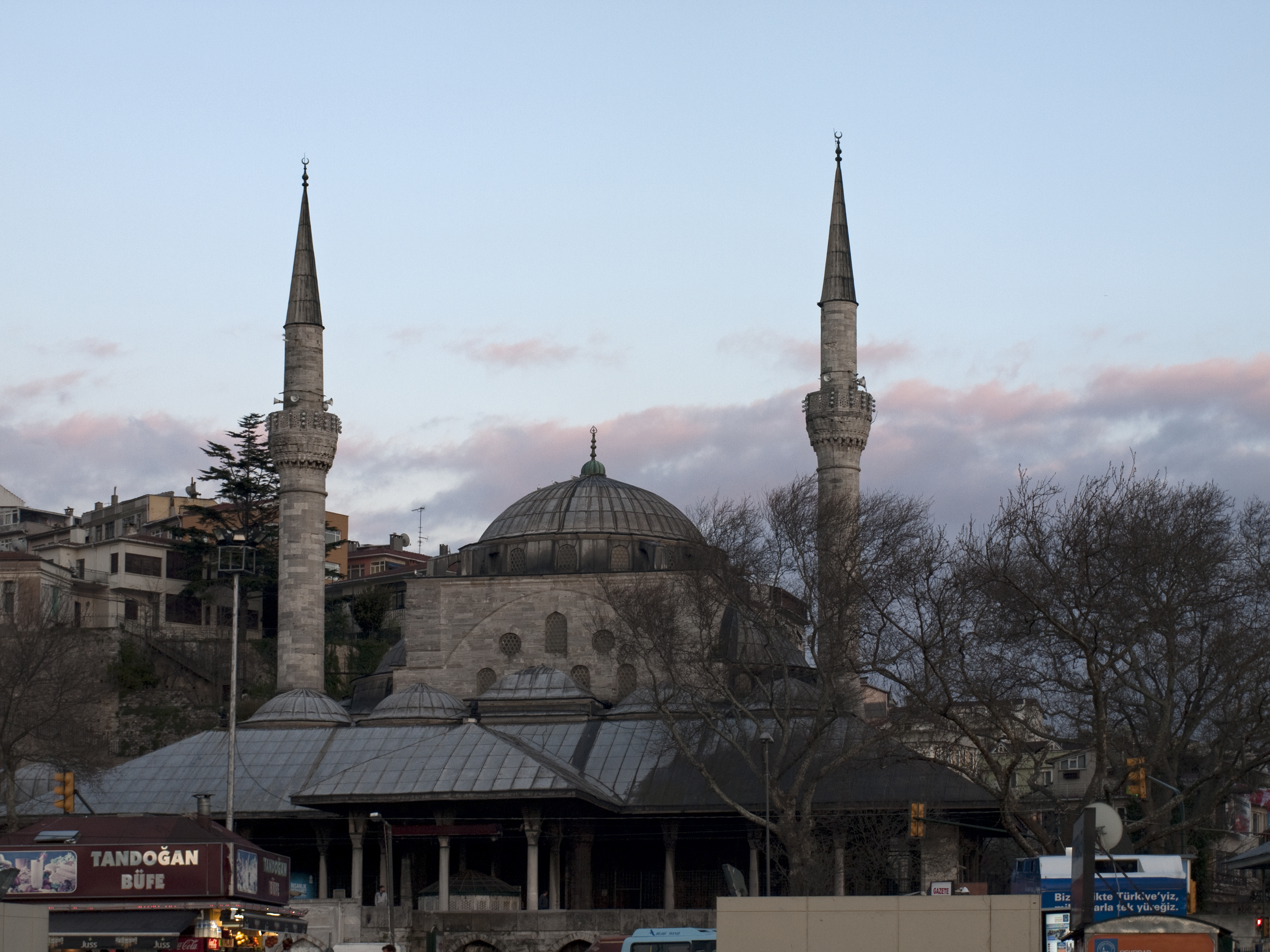
The frontal view

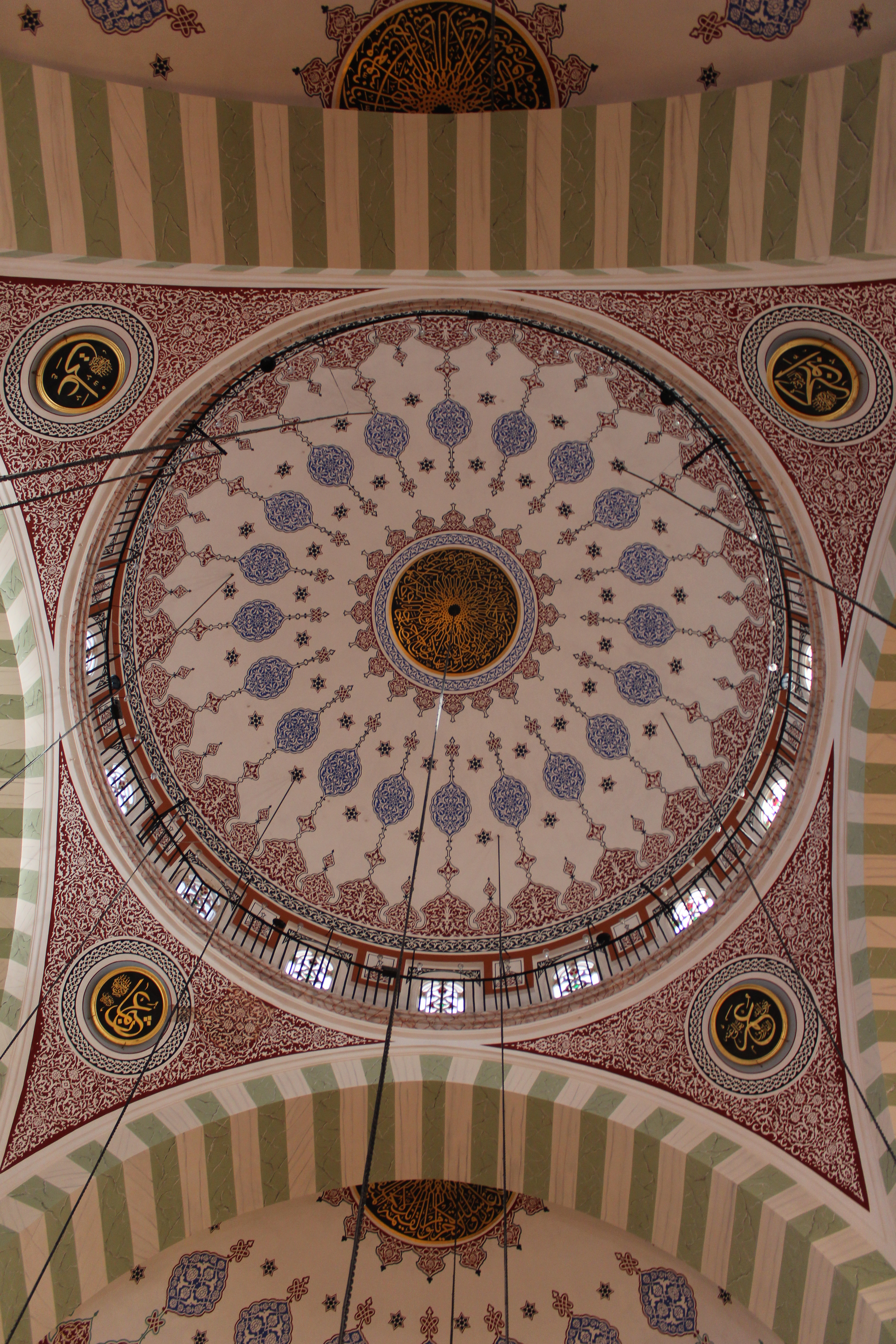
Interior view of the dome

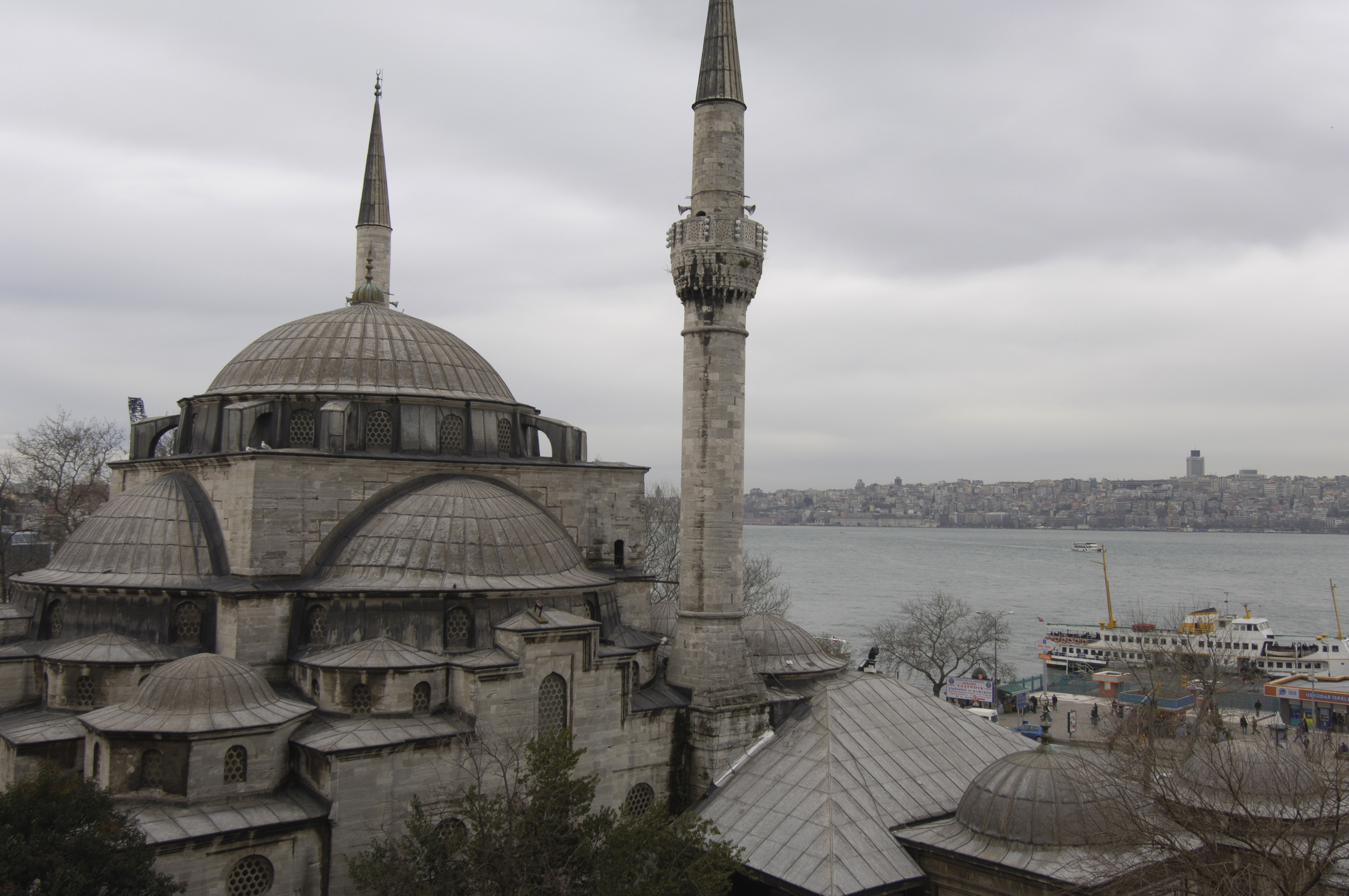
Mihrimah Sultan Mosque Uskudar from hill behind

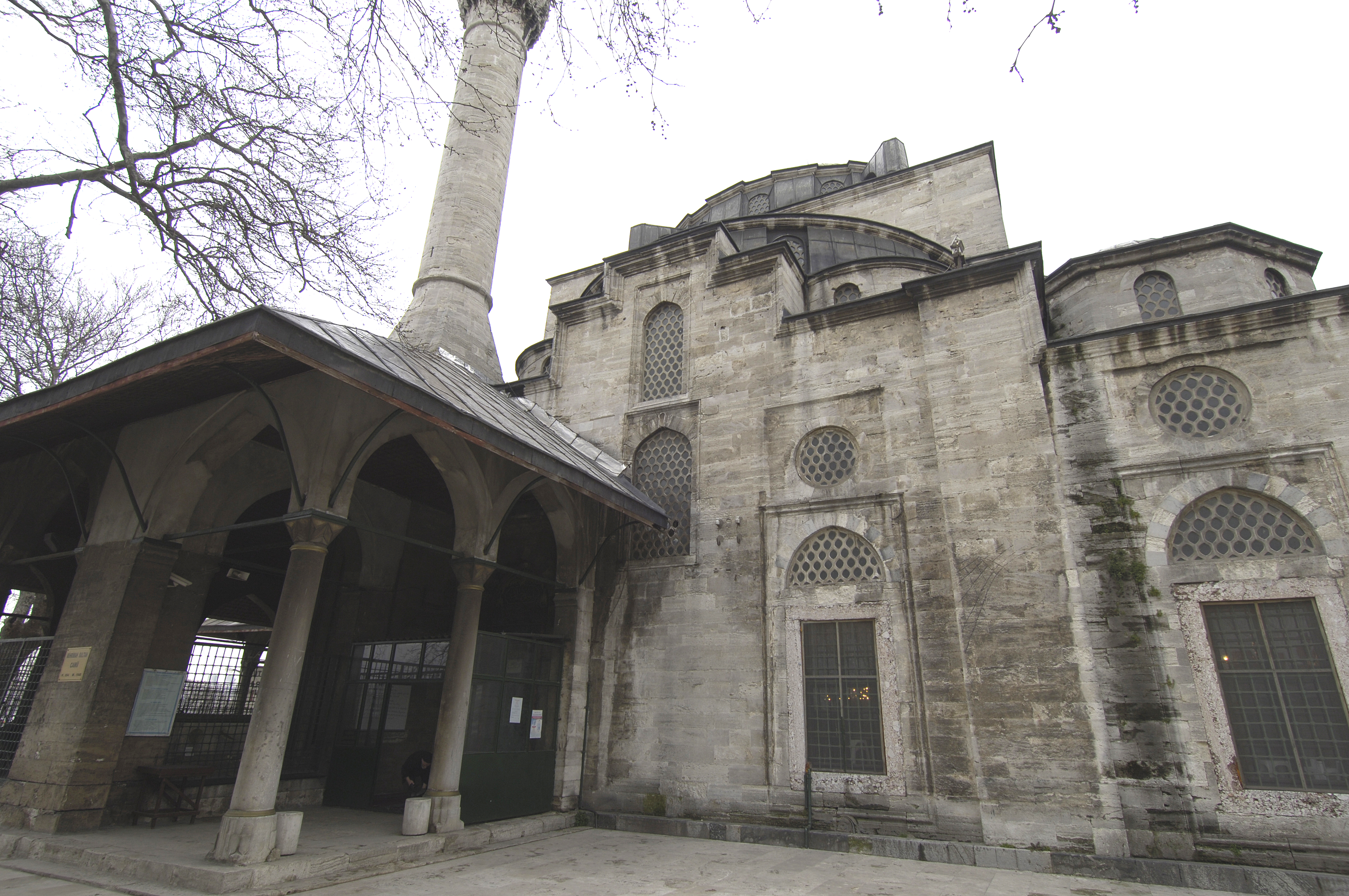
Mihrimah Sultan Mosque Uskudar from the west

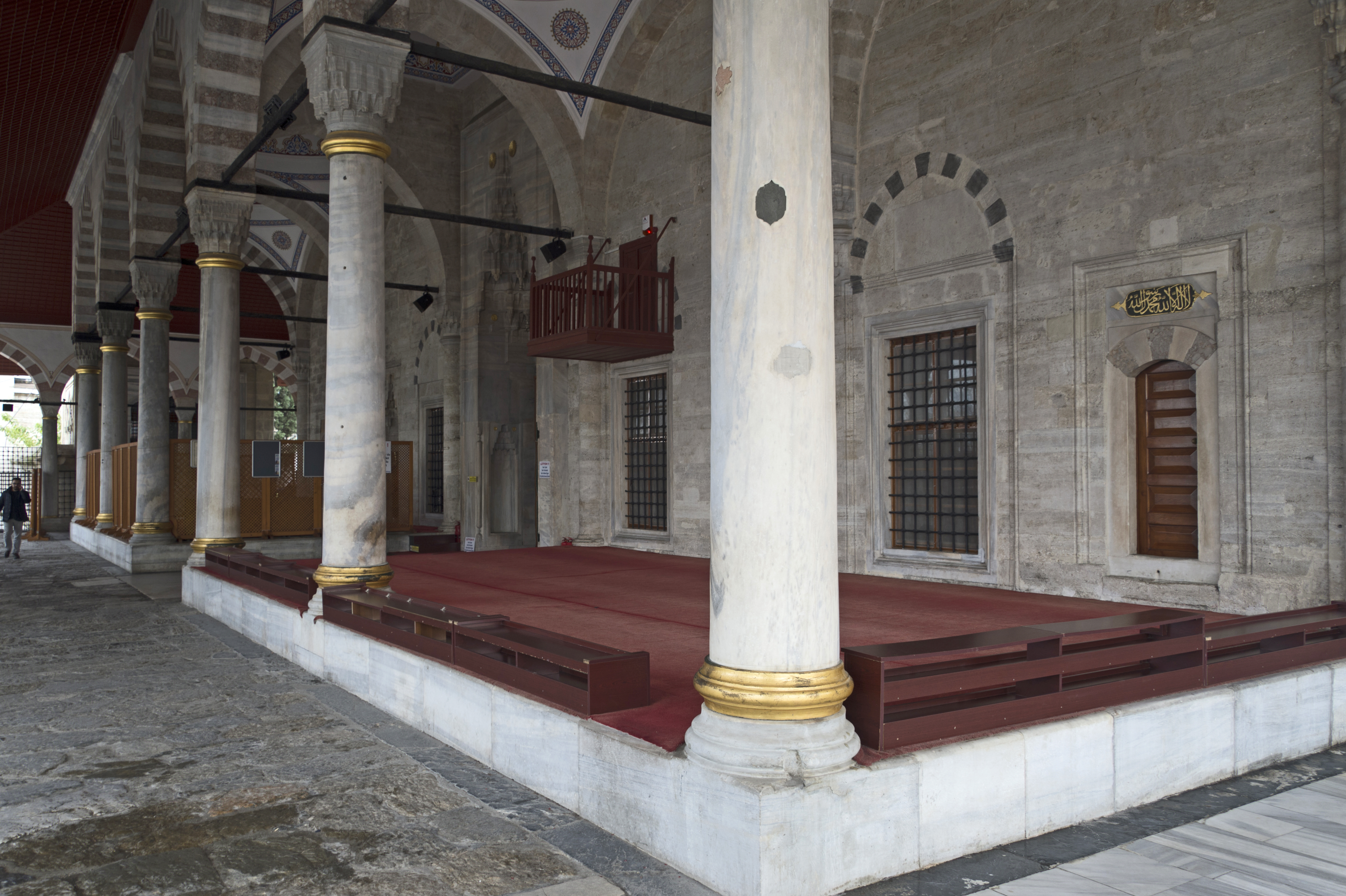
Mihrimah Sultan Mosque Uskudar son cemaat area

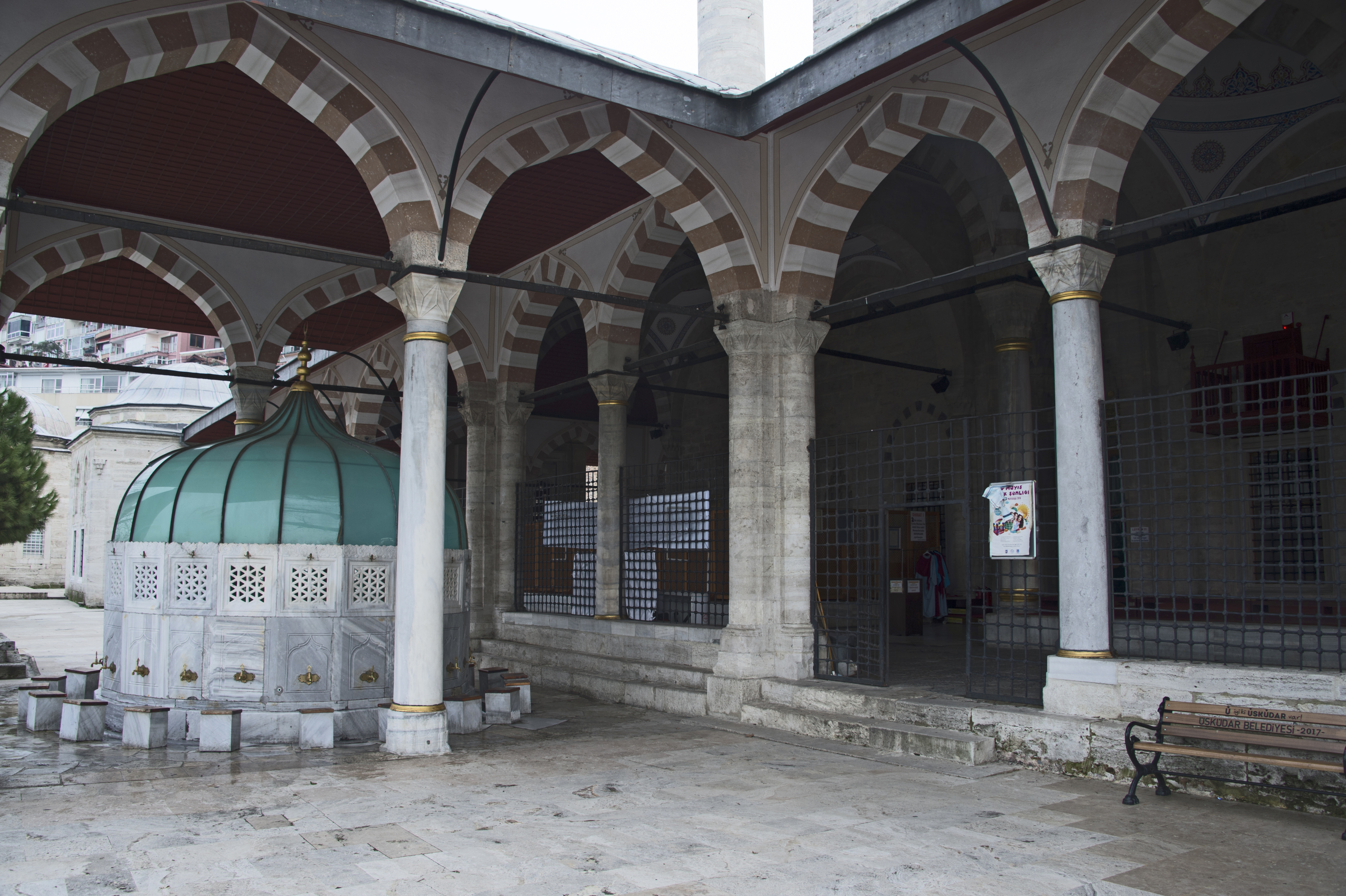
Mihrimah Sultan Mosque Uskudar with ablutions fountain

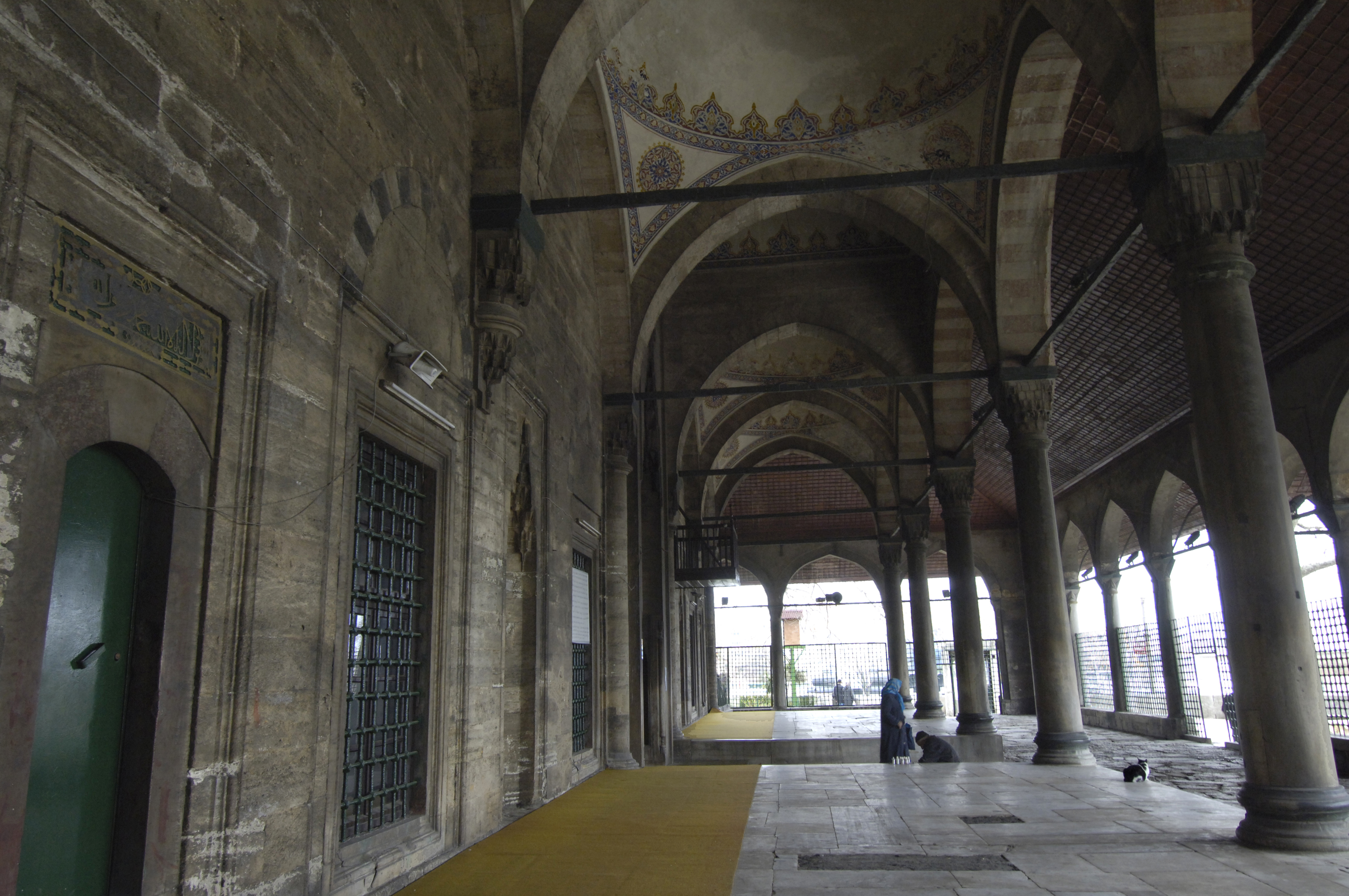
Mihrimah Sultan Mosque Uskudar son cemaat part

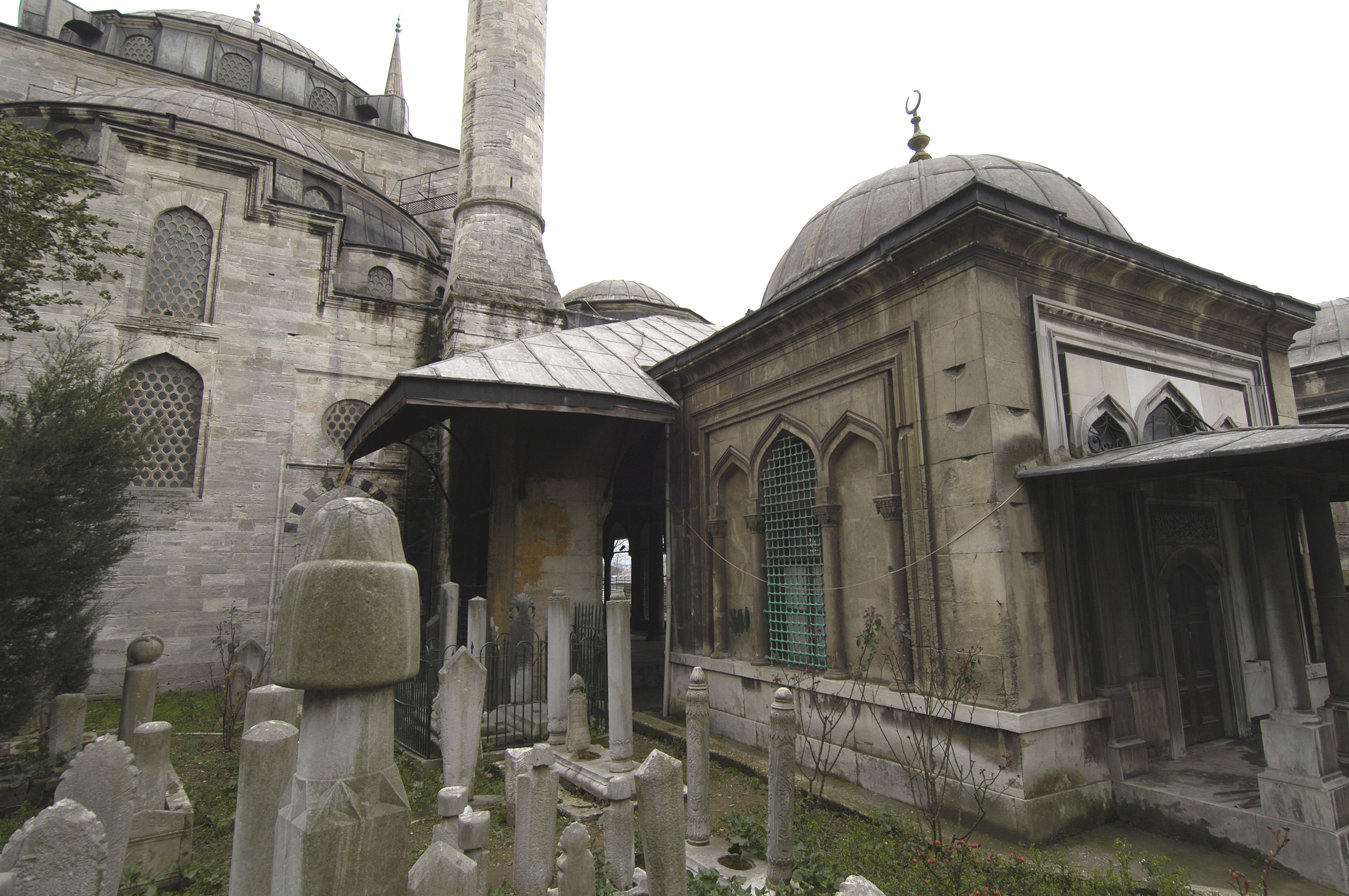
Mihrimah Sultan Mosque Uskudar from graveyard

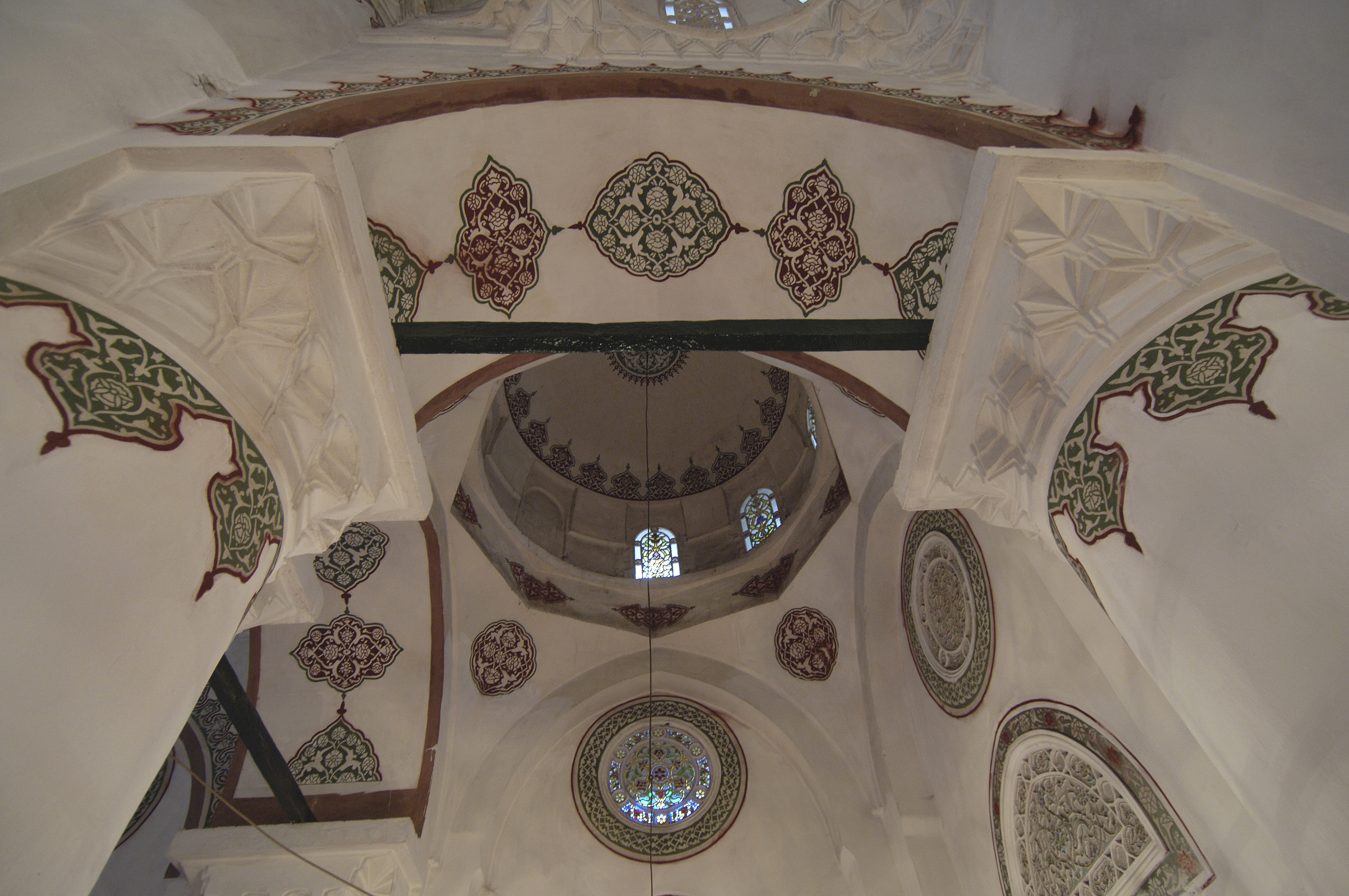
Mihrimah Sultan Mosque Uskudar dome

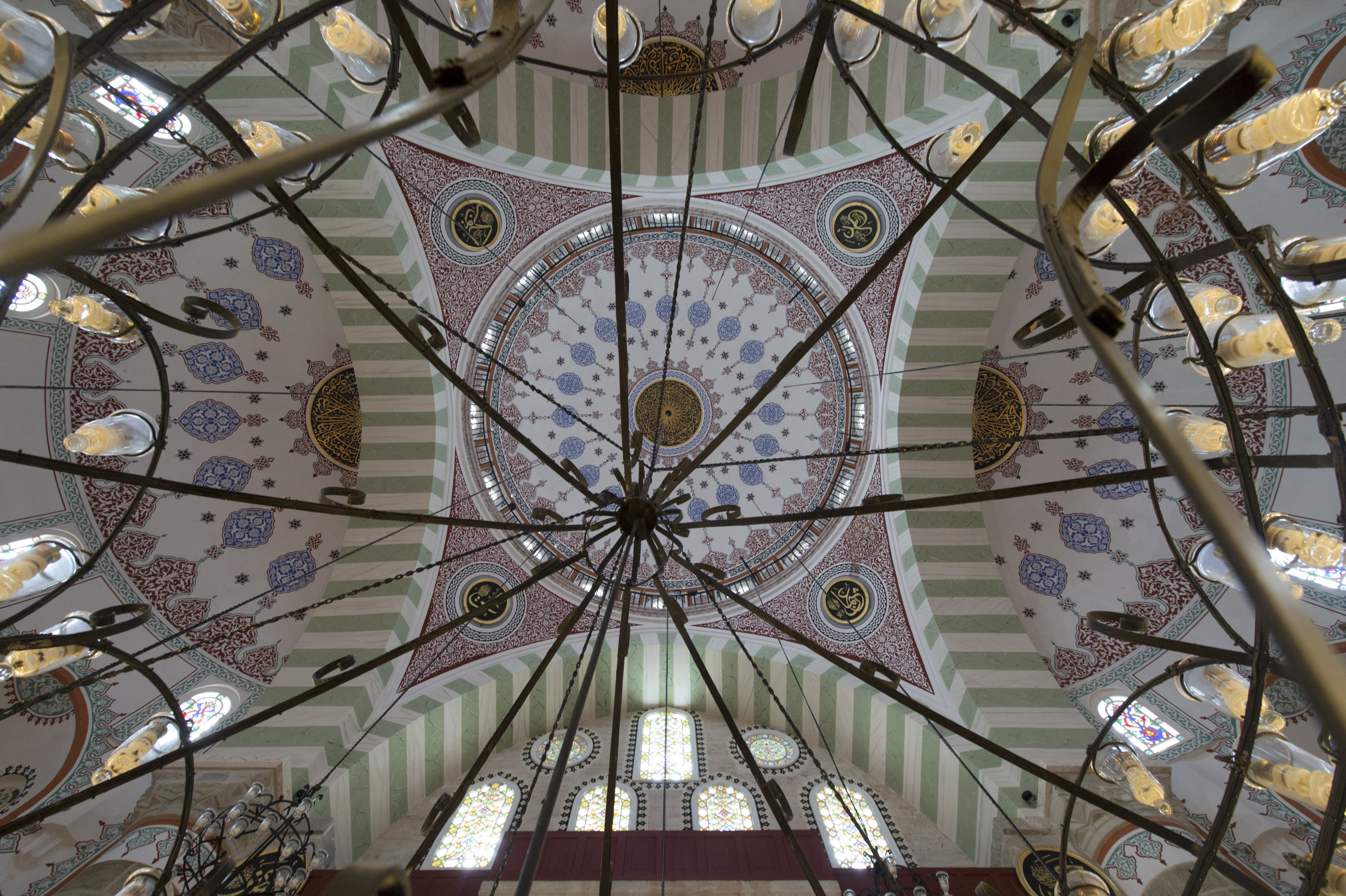
Mihrimah Sultan Mosque Uskudar domes

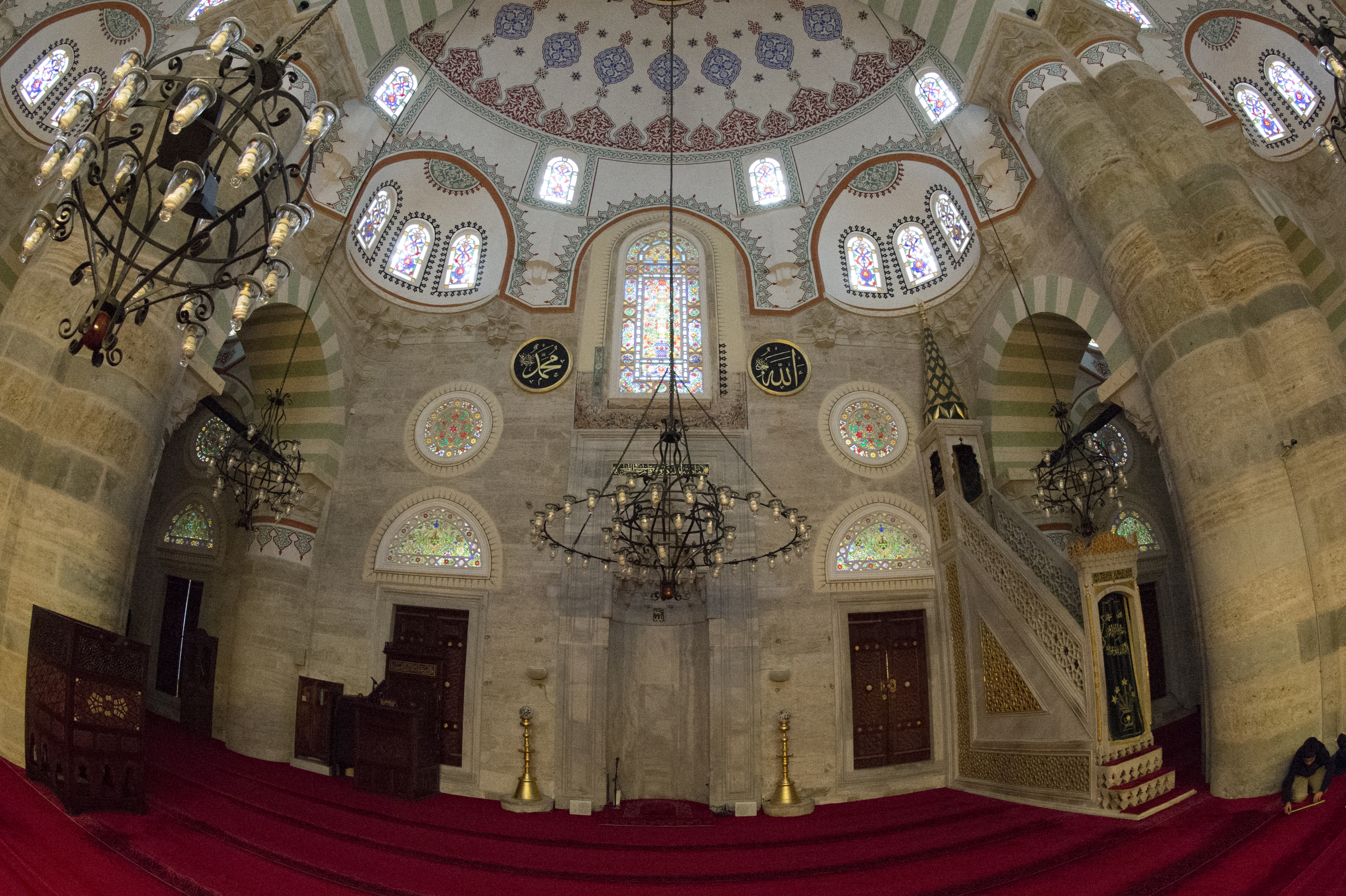
Mihrimah Sultan Mosque Uskudar minber and mihrab

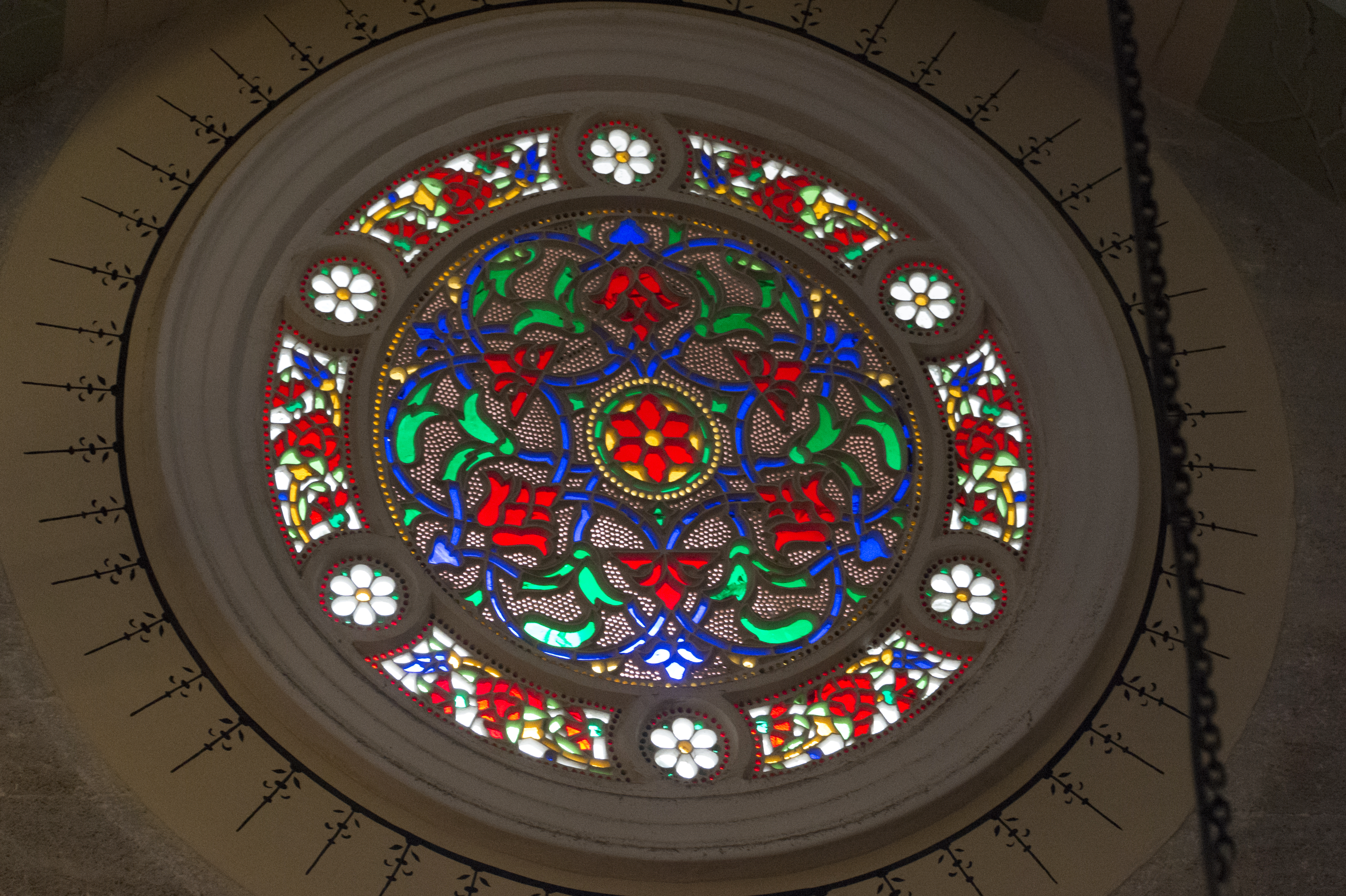
Mihrimah Sultan Mosque Uskudar window

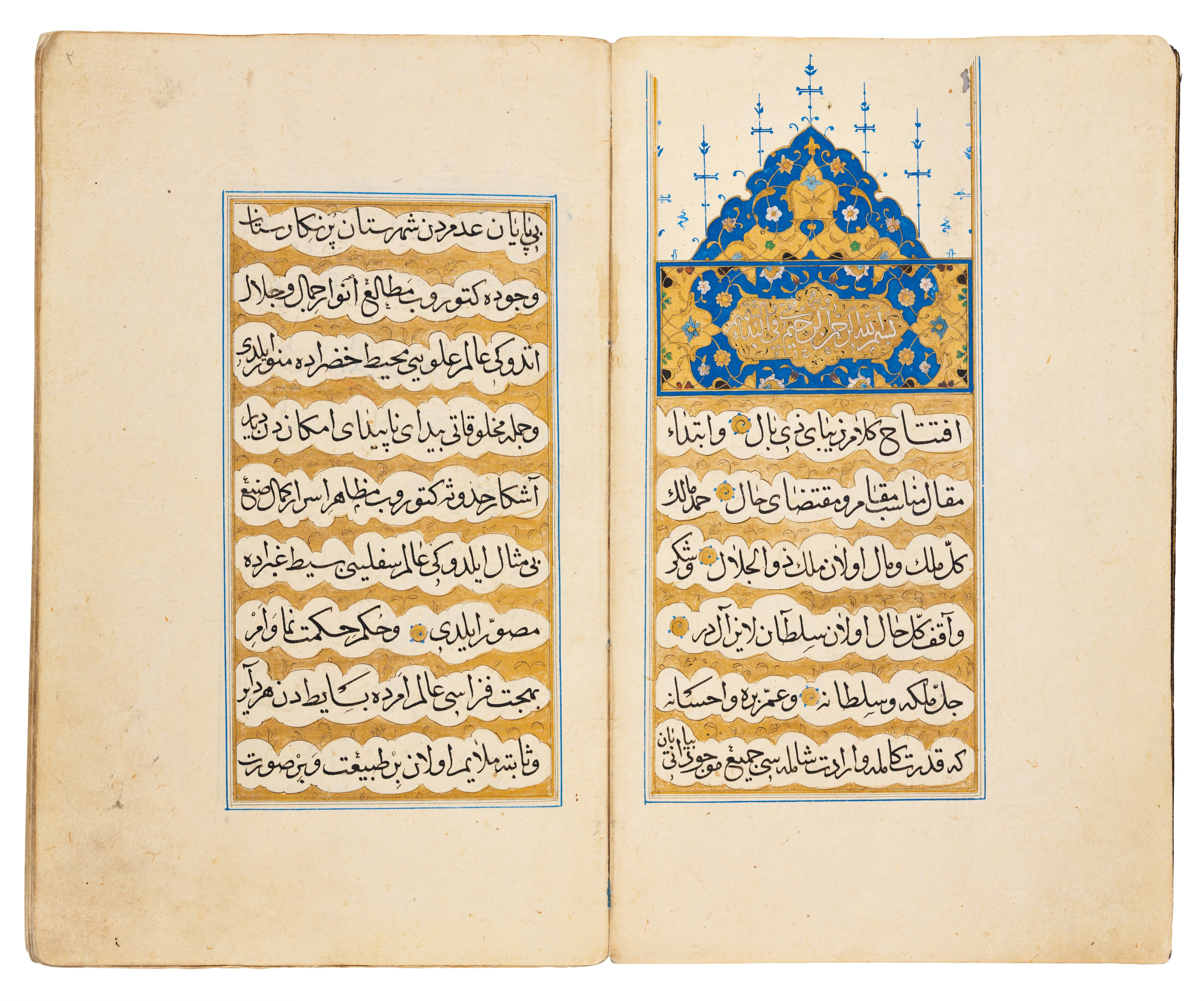
Endowment Deed of Mihrimah Sultan. This document concerns the endowment of properties in Anatolia and Rumelia, from which revenues were to be used to meet the expenses of the Mihrimah Sultan Mosque. April-March 1550. Sadberk Hanım Museum

== See also ==
- Yeni Valide Mosque
- Mihrimah Sultan Mosque, Edirnekapı
- List of Friday mosques designed by Mimar Sinan

== Sources ==
- Necipoğlu, Gülru (2005). The Age of Sinan: Architectural Culture in the Ottoman Empire. London: Reaktion Books. ISBN 978-1-86189-253-9.
