= Şeyh Muslihiddin =

Ottoman Sufi saint and scholar (1502–1574)

Şeyh Muslihiddin Nureddinzade
- Born: 1502; Anbarlı, Filibe, Ottoman Bulgaria (now Zhitnitsa, Plovdiv Province, Bulgaria)
- Died: 3 March 1574 (aged 71–72); Istanbul, Ottoman Empire
- Influences: Al-Ghazali; Ibn Arabi; Abdullah Ansari; Sadr al-Din al-Qunawi; Cemal Halvetî; Sofyali Bali Efendi
- Influenced: Sokollu Mehmed Pasha; Suleiman the Magnificent; Ismihan Sultan; Aziz Mahmud Hudayi; Ali Dede Bošnjak; Gelibolulu Mustafa Ali

Religious life
- Religion: Sunni Islam
- Order: Sufi
- Tariqa: Khalvati

Senior posting
- Successor: Ali Dede Bošnjak
- Disciple of: Sofyali Bali Efendi
- Disciples: Ali Dede Bošnjak, Aziz Mahmud Hudayi

Şeyh Muslihiddin Nureddinzade (1502–1574) was a Sufi saint and scholar of the Ottoman Empire who belonged to the Khalvati order. He was born near the city of Plovdiv in Ottoman Bulgaria. He went to Istanbul after being initiated as a Sufi, and gained many prominent followers, including grand vizier Sokollu Mehmed Pasha, Sultan Suleiman the Magnificent and Aziz Mahmud Hudayi, among others. He was very influential in getting Sultan Suleiman to join the campaign for the Siege of Szigetvár. He died a few years later and was buried in Edirnekapı, but his grave was lost forever during the construction of the Edirnekapı Martyr's Cemetery.

== Life and career ==
According to Ottoman chronicler Mehmed Süreyya, Mustafa Muslihuddin was born in 1502 in Anbarlı village (now Zhitnitsa, Plovdiv Province), located near the city of Filibe in Ottoman Bulgaria. His father was Nureddin Ahmed Efendi, who is said to have been a Sayyid (a descendant of prophet Muhammad). Mustafa was therefore known by the nisba (toponyms/patronym) of el-Filibevi, el-Konstantini, er-Rumi and Nureddinzade. He was tutored by Mehmed Efendi, also known as Mîrim Kösesi, an Anatolian kazasker (chief judge). He received his education in Edirne, probably during the 1520s.

Mustafa then became a student of Sofyali Bali Efendi in Sofia. After finishing his Seyru Süluk (Sufi journey), Mustafa was sent to Tatarpazarı (now Pazardzhik) as a Sheikh, during either the 1530s or the 1540s. He worked there for some years as a vaiz (preacher) and murshid (Sufi teacher). He gained many followers after he opened his Sufi lodge there. As part of the Khalvati quest to establish the supremacy of the Ottoman state and Sunni Islam, he probably clashed with the heterodox dervishes and abdals (saints) of the Zawiya (monastery) built by Malkoçoğlu Bali Bey. This Zawiya therefore disappears from recorded history after 1530. Mustafa received a daily allowance of three akçes from the Waqf (endowment) of Hadım Şehabeddin in Plovdiv, where he had lived since at least 1556. Complaints were sent to the capital Istanbul about Mustafa having political ambitions, and there were demands for his arrest. Mustafa consulted the Zeyniyye saint Şeyh Ali bin Sinan, who advised him to go to Istanbul, which he did before he could be legally prosecuted or arrested. Bosnian chronicler Muniri Belgradi says Mustafa went to Istanbul because of rumors against his teacher, Sofyali Bali Efendi. He probably arrived in the city 1562/1563.

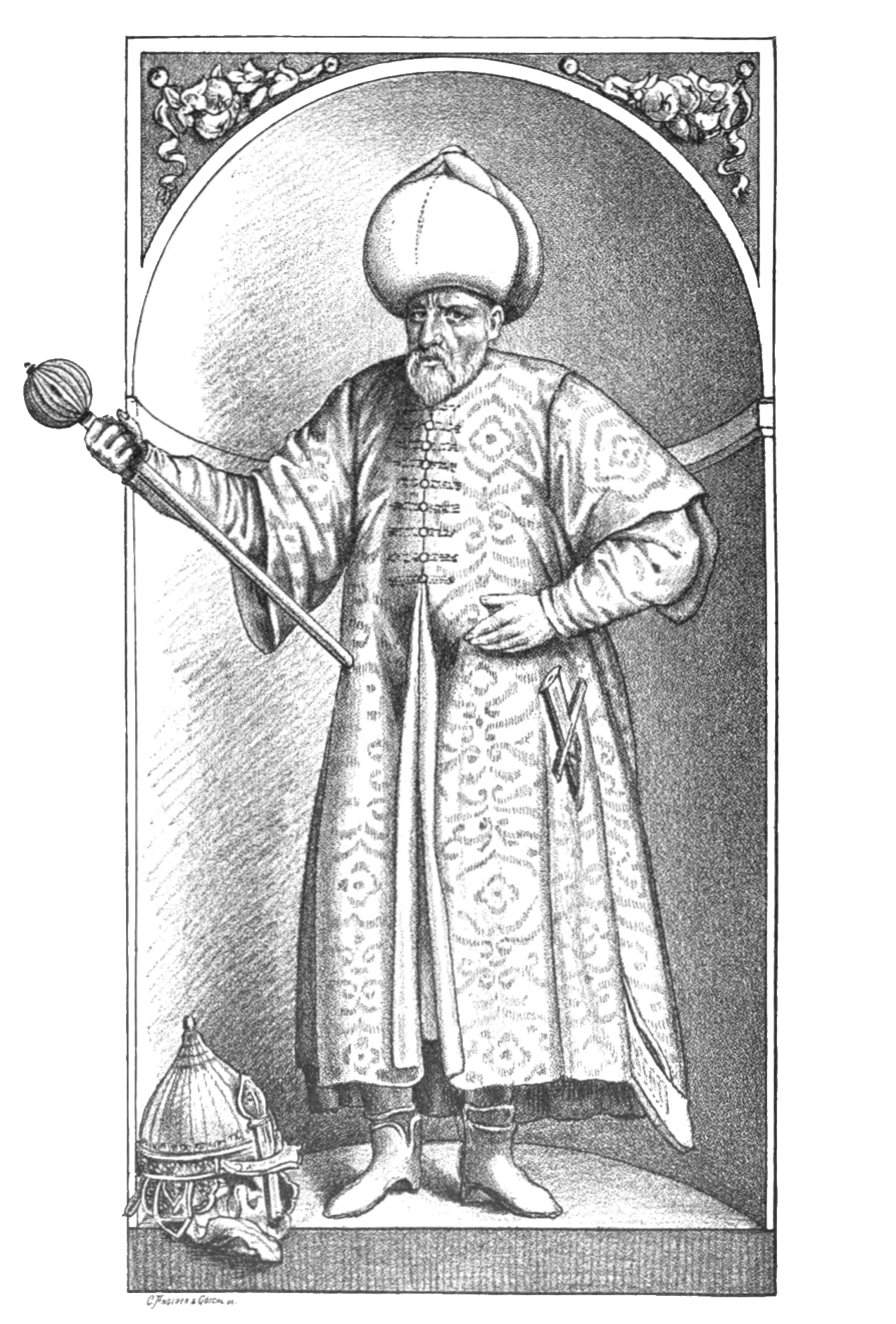
A portrait of Sokollu Mehmed Pasha

In Istanbul, Mustafa was hosted by the imam of the Zeyrek Mosque. He attended the discourses on tafsir (Quranic exegesis) given by Ebussuud Efendi after every week’s Friday prayers. An explanation given by Mustafa during a discussion was noticed by Ebussuud, who asked him about his background. When he came to know about the accusations against Mustafa, Ebussuud talked to the grand vizier and had the charges retracted. Mustafa later met the grand vizier himself, who was impressed by him. Heeding the advice of the grand vizier, he brought his family to Istanbul and was appointed as the sheikh of the Sufi lodge at the Küçük Ayasofya Mosque (the Little Hagia Sophia). Şeyh Muslihiddin held this appointment till his death. Aziz Mahmud Hudayi, another Ottoman Sufi, attended his talks as a student. He was also followed by many powerful people, chief among them Sultan Suleiman the Magnificent and grand vizier Sokollu Mehmed Pasha. Şeyh Muslihiddin was also patronized and followed by Ottoman princess Ismihan Sultan, the wife of Sokollu Mehmed Pasha.

Ali Dede Bošnjak, one of his disciples, completed his Seyru Süluk under his guidance. Both Şeyh Muslihiddin and Ali Dede belonged to the Cemaliyye branch of the Khalvati order, which was formed by those who followed the teachings of Cemal Halvetî. The relationship between the Khalvati order and the Ottoman dynasty continued to grow during the lifetimes of both Şeyh Muslihiddin and Ali Dede. Ottoman historian Gelibolulu Mustafa Ali had sent his historical accounts to Sokollu Mehmed Pasha through Şeyh Muslihiddin, and had requested an appointment as a katib (secretary), but he was rejected. Şeyh Muslihiddin was reportedly part of a group of scholars which met regularly and debated under the leadership of Ebussuud Efendi. Some other members of this group were Aşık Çelebi, Bâkî, Kınalızâde Hasan Çelebi, Abdülkadir Şeyhî Efendi, Hoca Sadeddin Efendi, Bostanzade Mehmed Efendi, Sunullah Efendi, Merkez Efendi and Ümmi Sinan.

=== Siege of Szigetvár ===
According to historical accounts, Şeyh Muslihiddin and Sokollu Mehmed Pasha persuaded Sultan Suleiman to participate in the siege of Szigetvár, in order to discharge his obligation of a last campaign of jihad. According to a legend, Sultan Suleiman decided he had to go to Szigetvár after he had a dream of Şeyh Muslihiddin telling him to do so. The Süleymannâme, written by Ottoman historian Karaçelebizade Abdülaziz Efendi, states Şeyh Muslihiddin had a dream where Prophet Mohammad condemned Sultan Suleiman for not joining the jihad. When he told the Sultan about this dream, the Sultan decided to join the campaign. Ottoman historian Joseph von Hammer-Purgstall says Şeyh Muslihiddin had criticized Sultan Suleiman for not participating in the jihad. It is probable Şeyh Muslihiddin was expressing the discontent of the general public or the janissaries at the Sultan not participating, as a member of a group the grand vizier was actually leading.

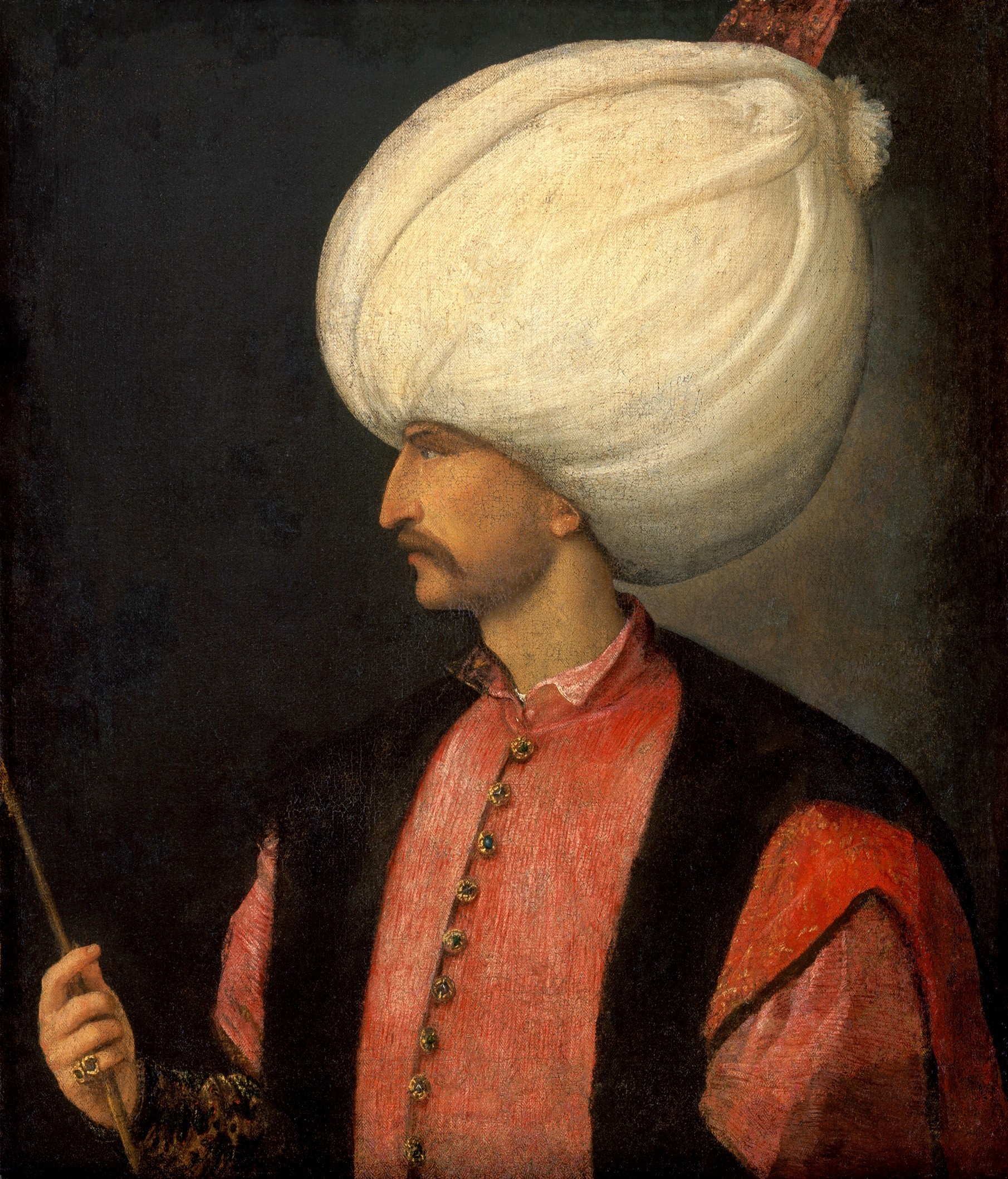
A portrait of Sultan Suleiman the Magnificent by Titian (c. 1530)

As such, Şeyh Muslihiddin was one of the few sheikhs who gave dhikr (reminder of God) to Sultan Suleiman. Ottoman chronicler Mustafa Selaniki says Şeyh Muslihiddin was present along with his dervishes on the front lines of the siege. Şeyh Muslihiddin accompanied Sokollu Mehmed Pasha and Sultan Suleiman on the campaign. When the sultan died, Şeyh Muslihiddin helped bring his body back to Istanbul. According to Ottoman chronicler Mehmed Süreyya, Şeyh Muslihiddin returned to Belgrade with the sultan's body, took part in the funeral prayers there, and was part of the entourage which accompanied the body to Istanbul. Ali Dede was appointed the sheikh of the Sufi lodge built near the Sultan's tomb in Turbék. The execution of Arslan Pasha, the Beylerbey (governor) of Buda, was probably orchestrated by Şeyh Muslihiddin along with Kurd Efendi, who was also a student of his teacher Bali Efendi.

=== Later life and death ===
Sultan Suleiman probably gave his 1000-bead rosary to Şeyh Muslihiddin sometime before his death, who in turn gifted it to Şeyh Ahmed Şernûbî. Şeyh Muslihiddin also had a close relationship with Sultan Selim II, the successor of Sultan Suleiman. Sultan Selim II had asked Şeyh Muslihiddin to pray for him when he was going to campaign in Cyprus in 1570 during the Ottoman–Venetian War (1570–1573). Şeyh Muslihiddin is highly likely to have been involved in the persecution of the dervishes of the Seyyid Battal Gazi Complex in Anatolia. He also moved the Ottoman administration to act against heretic Sufis in the Balkans. Şeyh Muslihiddin was one of the Sufis who complained against Bosnian Sufi leader Hamza Bali to the state authorities sometime around this period. The complaints against Hamza Bali were based on his contrarian understanding of the primacy of sharia laws. Hamza Bali was captured in 1573 from Tuzla in Bosnia by a Çavuş, and later executed in June that same year; Şeyh Muslihiddin was the person who ordered both the arrest and execution.

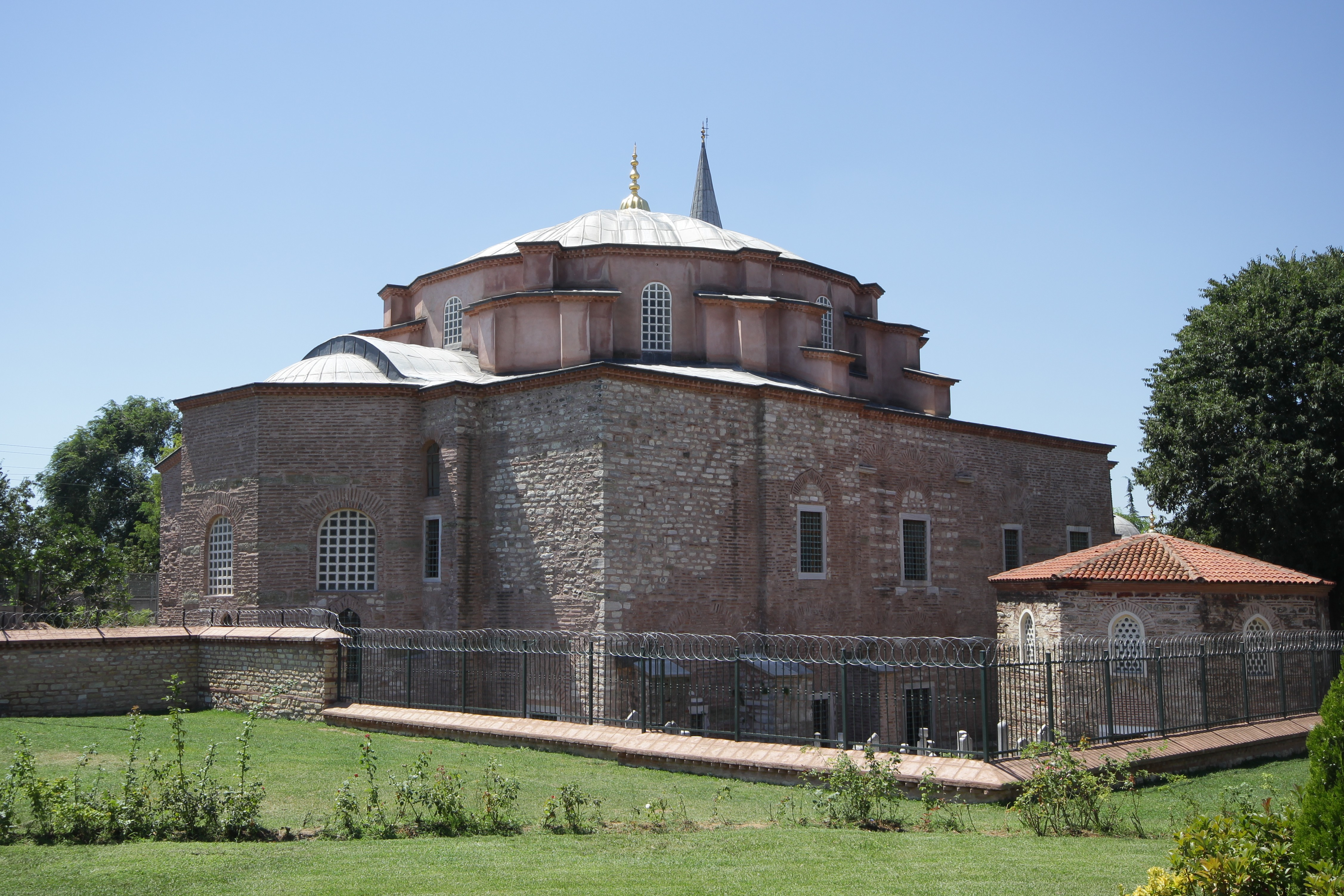
The Little Hagia Sophia, also known as the Küçük Ayasofya, where Şeyh Muslihiddin worked for most of his life

Sokollu Mehmed Pasha commissioned architect Mimar Sinan to build the Sokollu Mehmed Pasha Mosque in Kadırga, which also had a lodge built for Şeyh Muslihiddin. However, the Şeyh died before the mosque was completed, and the lodge was entrusted to Kurd Mehmed Efendi. Şeyh Muslihiddin died on 3 March 1574 (22 Dhu al-Qadah, A. H. 981). He was buried at Hayrettepe in Edirnekapı, but his grave was lost forever during the construction of the Edirnekapı Martyr's Cemetery. According to Mehmed Süreyya, Şeyh Muslihiddin was buried near the Amir Sultan Cemetery, the tomb of Amir Sultan Bukhari in Bursa. In 1584, Aziz Mahmud Hudayi succeeded Şeyh Muslihiddin as the sheikh of the Sufi lodge at the Küçük Ayasofya.

=== Legacy ===
A mosque and a Zawiya were built in Plovdiv in the name of Şeyh Muslihiddin. Both the mosque and the Zawiya were probably located in the Mecca Mescidi neighbourhood of the city. A cash Waqf (endowment) was also set up for both institutions. A 1596 document by the Waqf administrator records that the Waqf was established with an amount of 70,000 akçes lent at 10% interest. The Zawiya had a soup kitchen, and a minimum staff size of one imam and one muezzin. A document records that the mosque was located near the Maritsa river. It is possible the Zawiya was previously a lodge built for the followers of Otman Baba. This document also says both the mosque and the Zawiya were located in the Haci Ömer area in the northwestern part of the city. The Zawiya was abolished sometime during the 18th or 19th centuries.

== Views ==
Şeyh Muslihiddin, in his commentary on Sheikh Bedreddin Simavi’s work, says the Sheikh had espoused blasphemous views if he had argued against universal resurrection from the dead and argued for the creation of new spirits after Judgement Day. Şeyh Muslihiddin also criticises Sheikh Bedreddin for arguing angels, jinns and Satan were not real and instead claiming they were esoteric spirits. The ideas of Sheikh Bedreddin and his commentators like Abdullah-ı İlahi and Şeyh Yavsî on fundamental Sufi principles like Kashf (revelations), Dhawq (spiritual experience), Taqlid (conformity to a teacher), and the bodily death of Jesus were heavily disparaged by Şeyh Muslihiddin. Şeyh Muslihiddin was also critical of their views on fundamental Islamic beliefs like Akhirah (the afterlife) and Jannah and Jahannam (heaven and hell).

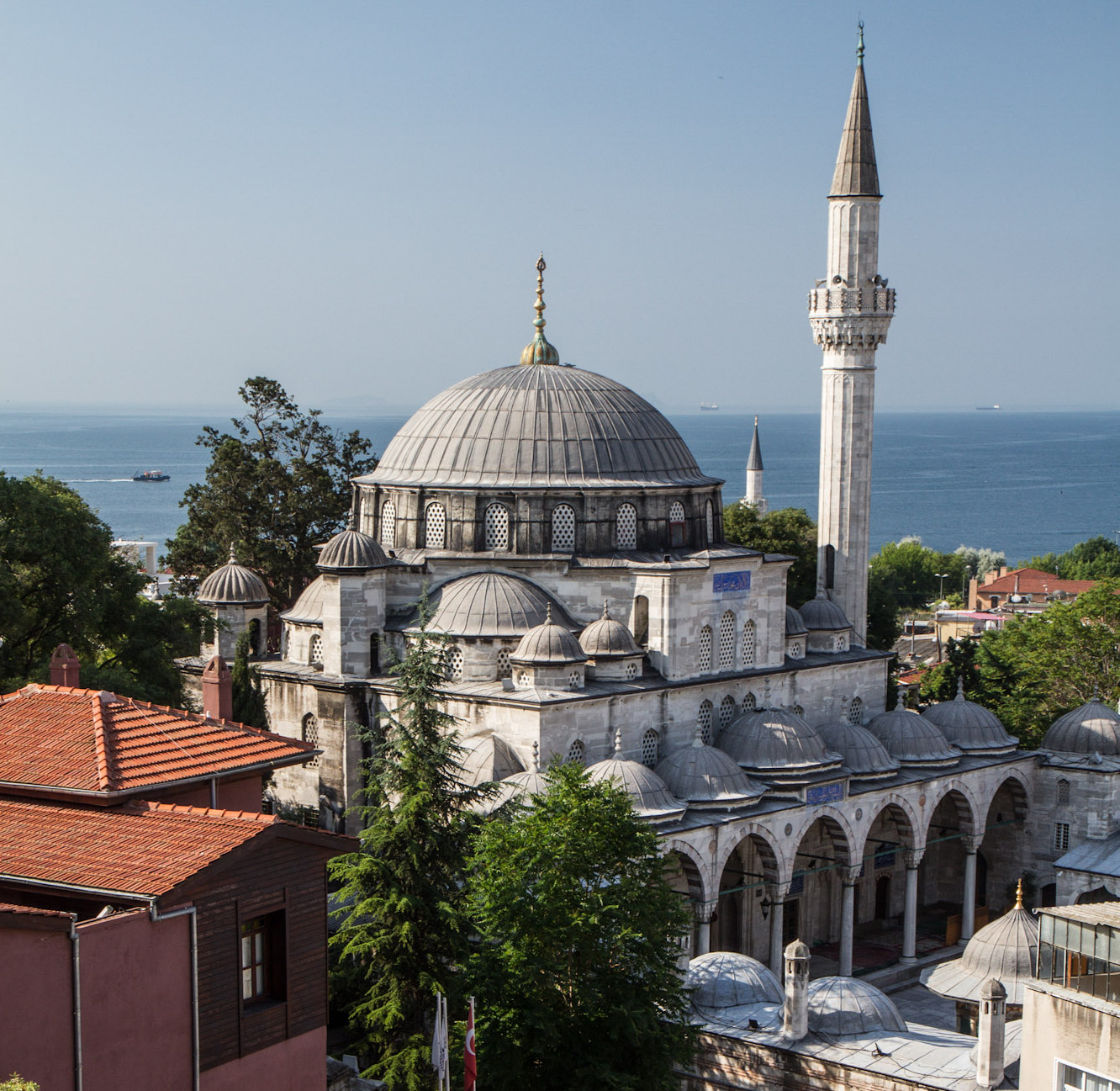
The Sokollu Mehmed Pasha Mosque, Kadırga, which had a Sufi lodge built for Şeyh Muslihiddin

Şeyh Muslihiddin argued Sheikh Bedreddin had taken a very Batiniyya (allegorical) approach for the exegesis of the Quran. Şeyh Muslihiddin also argued Sheikh Bedreddin was hypocritical, because the latter had said the seekers of truth should not get involved in worldly affairs like politics, yet he himself participated in politics and started an uprising where many faithful Muslims were killed. Among the many commentators on Sheikh Bedreddin, Şeyh Muslihiddin was the only one who believed he was the leader of this uprising. However, Şeyh Muslihiddin did not criticise Sheikh Bedreddin’s work entirely, he just commented on its most controversial sections.

Şeyh Muslihiddin’s criticism of Simaviism was based on the theology and jurisprudence of Sunni Islam. His understanding of Sufism was opposed to Shia, Batini and Ibahi ideologies; and he believed real Sufism should only be experienced and understood along with sharia law. Wahdat al-wujūd, or the unity of being, was important to his version of Sufism, and he believed its propounder Ibn Arabi hadn’t contradicted sharia law. However, he believed the Simavis hadn’t understood Ibn Arabi completely, and had instead arrived at incorrect interpretations. Şeyh Muslihiddin claimed the Simavis were heretics and blasphemers because of their views on universal resurrection and Islamic cosmology. He was also opposed to Uşşaki Sufis and the followers of İbrâhim Gülşenî. In his work on the exegesis of the Al-Qadr chapter of the Quran, Şeyh Muslihiddin does not adopt the traditional approach for Quranic interpretation. He instead uses a liberal and more mystical approach, and discusses the chapter’s interpretation using Sufi methods, Quranic verses and the Hadith. In this work, he also expounds on the importance of Iʿtikāf (religious seclusion).

== Analysis ==
Şeyh Muslihiddin had close relationships with powerful Ottoman figures, just like Bali Efendi and Aziz Mahmud Hudayi. Şeyh Muslihiddin also had views on Simaviism which were very similar to those of Ebussuud Efendi, Bali Efendi and Aziz Mahmud Hudayi. As such, these Sufis made many efforts to protect the Sunni Islamic nature of Sufism, and to safeguard the Ottoman state against newly developed Sufi ideologies which were separatist and did not conform to Sunni Islam. Also, during this period, Ottoman–Safavid relations were worsening and the Celali rebellions in Anatolia were in full swing. Safavid Iran had recently converted from Sunni Islam to Shia Islam, and was trying to similarly convert and conquer the Ottomans by using the Kalenderi, Hurufi and Işık orders of Sufism. In this environment, the Sufi orders which were more Sunni in nature, especially the Khalvatis, were fighting back against this Safavid religious propaganda. Şeyh Muslihiddin’s understanding of Sufism is, therefore, highly likely to have been shaped by the times he lived in.

Şeyh Muslihiddin is said to be a 16th-century version of Al-Ghazali. He was called the Hasan al-Basri of his times by Ottoman chronicler Muniri Belgradi. Belgradi also says the Khalvati order in Rumelia was affiliated with him and thus came to be known as the Nureddinzade order. Ottoman historian and poet Nev'îzâde Atâyî, in an analogy, says Şeyh Muslihiddin is like “Yusuf-u Misr-i Irfan”, like Yusuf in Egypt but armed with Irfan (spiritual knowledge). According to Islamic scholar Mehmet Tabakoğlu, Şeyh Muslihiddin can be understood as a person who blended Abdullah Ansari’s brand of Sufism; Al-Ghazali’s understanding of Sunni Islam; Ibn Arabi and Sadr al-Din al-Qunawi’s interpretation of the Wahdat al-wajud; Bali Efendi’s interpretation of Tariqa (Sufi order); and the knowledge he had accumulated of Islam to become a Sufi who maintained absolute conformity to the Quran and Sunnah.

Şeyh Muslihiddin was himself criticized by many Sufis for his close relationships with powerful political figures, allowing many followers to become his disciples and making them his Khalifa (successors). These acts of his were called Bid'ah (heretical innovations). Şeyh Muslihiddin believed he could benefit more people if he could guide the ruling class directly. However, Şeyh Muslihiddin was well known for following the ascetic life of a Sufi by preferring simplicity in eating, drinking and clothing.

== Works ==
Some of the works by Şeyh Muslihiddin, mostly written in Arabic, are:

- Başından En'am suresine kadar Kur'an tefsiri (The interpretation of the Qur'an from the beginning till the Surah An'am).
- Şerhü'n-Nüsûs li Sadreddin Konevî (A Commentary on the Nusus (laws) of Sadreddin Konevi).
- Menâzilü's-Sâirin Tercümesi (A Translation of the Menâzilü's-Sâirin by Abdullah Ansari).
- Risâletü'l-Mi'râci'n-Nebi aleyhisselam (Risalah (treatise) on the ascension to heaven of Prophet Muhammad).
- Risâle-i Vahdet-i Vücûd (Risalah on the Wahdat al-wujūd, or the Unity of Being).
- Fezailu'l-jihad (The virtue of jihad).
- Makale fi'l-avâlimi'l-külliyye (Article on the subject of the whole).
- Şerḥu'l-Vâridât: Risâle fî îżâḥi ma vaḳaʿa fi's-sırri'lleẕî ebânehû Maḥmûd es-Simâvî (A Commentary on Varidat. Risalah explaining, in detail, the case of the secret or whispered interpretation of Mahmud Simavi). A critical commentary on Sheikh Bedreddin's work.
- Tercüme-i Fıkhü'l-Keydânî (Translation of the Fıkhü'l-Keydânî by Lutfullah en-Nasafi el-Keydânî).
- Fukarâya Nasîhat (Advice to the Poor).
- Tafsir (exegesis) of the Al-Qadr, Al-Asr and Al-Ikhlas chapters of the Quran.
- Hakikatü’l-Hakaik fî Keşfi Esrâri’d-Dekâ’ik (The truth of truth according to the Keşfi Esrâr by Rashiduddin Meybudi). This work was, however, not written by Şeyh Muslihiddin but by Şeyh Yavsî.
- Risâle fi rüyeti Mustafa b. Nureddin fi menâmihî Resûllüllah (s.a.v.) (Risalah by Mustafa son of Nureddin on his vision of the name of the Prophet (PBUH)).
- Lailahe İllallah, Allah, Hû, Hakk, Hayy, Kayyûm, Kahhâr ism-i şerifleriyle zikir usulü hakkında Risâle (Risalah about the methods of dhikr with the honorable names of Lailahe Illallah, Allah, Hu, Hakk, Hayy, Kayyum, Kahhar).
- Risale-i Müteallika fi’l-hukmi ve’l-mahkûm (Risalah on the mutuality of the judge and the condemned).

Other works attributed to Şeyh Muslihiddin are the Risale-i Vakıa (Risalah on facts) and the Tercüme-i Keşfi’l-Umur (translation of the Keşfi’l-Umur). A commentary on the first 40 verses of the Al-Fatiha and Al-Baqara chapters of the Quran is often attributed to Şeyh Muslihiddin, however, this commentary was written by Jami. A commentary on the Qasidat al-Burda by Al-Busiri is also attributed to Şeyh Muslihiddin, but it was written by Muhyiddin Kocevi. Şeyh Muslihiddin had, however, written a commentary on Beyzâvî which was in the possession of Muhyiddin Kocevi; which could have caused this misattribution. The Risâle fi’t-tasavvuf (Risalah on Sufism), which expounds on how a sultan should rule, is often attributed to Şeyh Muslihiddin.

== Bibliography ==
=== Books and book chapters ===
- Altın, Kutse (2021). "The Reconstruction of the Motives and Activities of the Last Campaign of Kanuni Sultan Süleyman" (PDF). In Zimonyi, István (ed.). Altaic and Chagatay Lectures: Studies in Honour of Éva Kincses-Nagy. Szeged: University of Szeged. pp. 21–41. ISBN 9789633067949. Archived from the original on 20 May 2025.
- Boykov, Grigor (2020). "Abdāl-affiliated Convents and "Sunnitizing" Halveti Dervishes in Sixteenth-Century Ottoman Rumeli" (PDF). In Krstić, Tijana; Terzioğlu, Derin (eds.). Historicizing Sunni Islam in the Ottoman Empire, c. 1450-c. 1750. Islamic History and Civilization. Vol. 177. Leiden and Boston: Brill. pp. 308–340. doi:10.1163/9789004440296_010. ISBN 9789004440296. Archived (PDF) from the original on 10 October 2025.
- Clayer, Nathalie (1994). Mystiques, État et Société: Les Halvetis dans l'aire balkanique de la fin du XVe siècle à nos jours [Mystics, State and Society: The Halvetis in the Balkans from the End of the 15th Century Upto the Present Day] (in French). Leiden, Boston and Köln: Brill. doi:10.1163/9789004492783. ISBN 978-90-04-10090-9.
- Crane, Howard; Akin, Esra (2006). Necipoğlu, Gülru (ed.). Sinan's Autobiographies: Five Sixteenth-Century Texts. Muqarnas Supplements. Vol. 11. Leiden and Boston: Brill. doi:10.1163/9789047406662. ISBN 9789047406662.
- Fodor, Pál, ed. (2019). The Battle for Central Europe: The Siege of Szigetvár and the Death of Süleyman the Magnificent and Nicholas Zrínyi (1566). Leiden and Boston: Brill. doi:10.1163/9789004396234. ISBN 978-90-04-39623-4.

=== Journals and theses ===
- Alkan, Harun (2017). "Mehmet Tabakoğlu, XVI. yy.'da Tenkitçi Bir Mutasavvıf: Nureddinzade, Hayatı, Eserleri Ve Tasavvuf Anlayışı, Emin Yay., Bursa, 2017". AKADEMİAR Akademik İslam Araştırmaları Dergisi (in Turkish). 3 (3): 237–242.
- Bölükbaşı, Ayşe (2015). XVI. yüzyılda İstanbul'daki Halveti Tekkeleri [Khalwati Convents in 16th Century Istanbul] (PhD thesis) (in Turkish). Istanbul: Istanbul Technical University.
- Boykov, Grigor (2013). Mastering the Conquered Space: Resurrection of Urban Life in Ottoman Upper Thrace (14th-17th c) (PhD thesis). Ankara: Bilkent University. hdl:11693/15822. S2CID 133339068.
- Bulut, Mehmet; Tuğrul, Mehmet (2016). "Osmanlı Filibesi'nin sosyo ekonomik durumuna genel bir bakış" [A Global View on the Socio-economic Situation of Ottoman Plovdiv]. Adam Akademi Sosyal Bilimler Dergisi (in Turkish). 6 (1): 85–112.
- Ceyhan, Semih; Koç, Muhammed Akif (2018). "Osmanlı'dan Cumhuriyet'e Şeyh Bedreddin Vâridât'ı: Bir Literatür Denemesi" [The Varidat of Sheikh Bedreddin from the Ottoman Empire to the Republic: A Literary Essay] (PDF). Türkiye Araştırmaları Literatür Dergisi (in Turkish). 16 (31–32): 233–331. S2CID 230714608.
- Efe, Seyfullah; Efe, Nefise (2022). "Filibeli Nûreddinzâde ve Kadr Sûresi Tefsiri" [Nureddinzade from Plovdiv and His Exegesis of the Surah al-Qadr]. FSM İlmî Araştırmalar İnsan ve Toplum Bilimleri Dergisi (in Turkish). 20 (Autumn): 331–357.
- Öngören, Reşat (2007). "Füsus Şârihi Sofyalı Bâlî Efendi'nin Tasavvufî Çizgisi" [The Sufi Lineage of the Fusus Commentator Bali Efendi of Sofia] (PDF). Tasavvuf: İlmî ve Akademik Araştırma Dergisi (in Turkish). IX (21, İbnü’l-Arabî Özel Sayısı): 57–66.
- Öztürk, Mehmet Cemal (2017). "Sokollu Mehmed Paşa'nin Şeyhi Nureddinzâde Mustafa Muslîhuddîn'nin Tekkesi Ve Eserleri" [The Sufi Lodge and Work of Nureddinzâde Mustafa Muslîhuddîn, Sheikh to Mehmed Pasha Sokolović]. Prilozi za orijentalnu filologiju (in Turkish) (66): 83–97.
- Öztürk, Şeyda (December 2019). ""Rûh-ı Nâtıka" Üzerine Yazılmış Bir Tasavvufî Manzume ve Ali Dede Bosnevî'ye Âidiyeti Mes'elesi" [A Sufi Poem on the “Rûh-ı Nâtıka” and the Question Whether It is Originally Authored by Ali Dede Bosnevî]. Turkish Academic Research Review (in Turkish). 4 (4): 475–503. doi:10.30622/tarr.649623. S2CID 212764001.
- Tabakoğlu, Mehmet (2016). Nureddinzade, hayatı, eserleri ve tasavvuf anlayışı [Nureddinzade, His Life, His Works and His Understanding of Sufism] (PhD thesis) (in Turkish). Ankara: Ankara University. S2CID 193772240.
- Tabakoğlu, Mehmet (2016b). "Nûreddinzâde'nin Bedreddin Simâvî'nin Vâridât'ına Yönelttiği Eleştiriler" [Nureddinzade’s Critiques of Bedreddin Simavi’s Varidat] (PDF). Toplum Bilimleri Dergisi (in Turkish). X (20): 117–134.
- Tek, Abdurrezak (January 2012). "Mystical Interpretation of Sheikh Badr al-Dīn Ibn Qāḍī Samāwnā's Controversial Ideas". Ilahiyat Studies. 3 (2): 197–221. doi:10.12370/13091719.2012.32.59.
- Yörükân, Yusuf Ziya (1952). "Bir Fetva Münasebetiyle Fetva Müessesesi, Ebussuud Efendi ve Sarı Saltuk" [The Fatwa Institution on the Occasion of a Fatwa, Ebussuud Efendi and Sarı Saltuk] (PDF). Ankara Üniversitesi İlahiyat Fakültesi Dergisi (in Turkish). 1 (2–3): 137–160.
