= Vefa =

Quarter in Istanbul, Turkey

- Quarter
- Location within Istanbul Fatih
- Coordinates: 41°00′59″N 28°57′37″E
- Country: Turkey
- Region: Marmara
- Province: Istanbul
- District: Fatih
- Time zone: UTC+3 (TRT)
- Postal code: 34134
- Area code: 0212

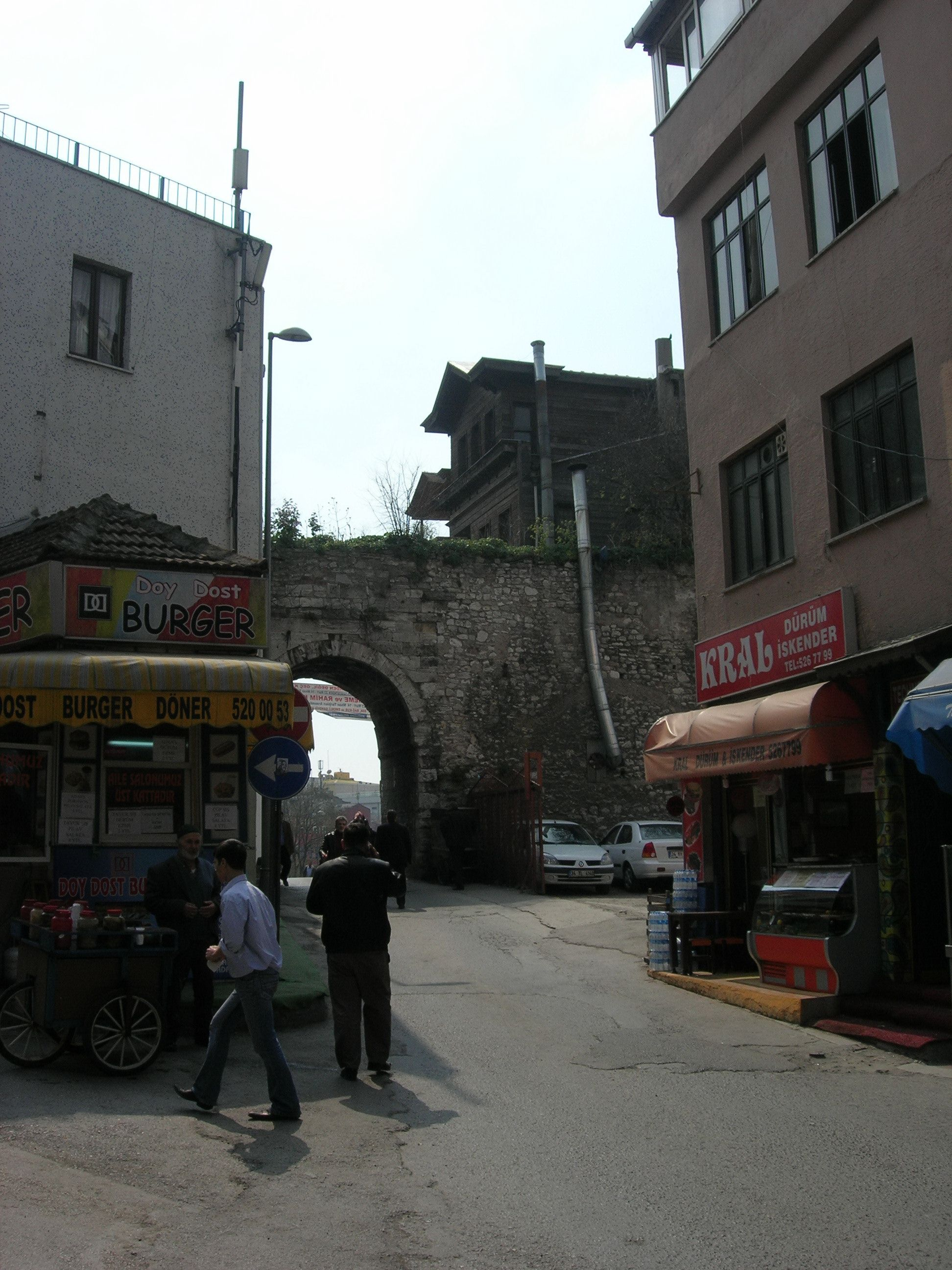
A street in Vefa, with an arch of the eastern section of the Valens Aqueduct in background. Behind it lies the Mosque of Kalenderhane.

Vefa is part of the district of Fatih in Istanbul, and lies inside what was once the old walled city of Constantinople. It lies roughly northwest of the eastern section of the Aqueduct of Valens, and is rich in monuments, both Byzantine and Ottoman. It takes its name from the Muslim saint (wali) Shaykh Ebu’l Vefa whose real name was Şeyh Muslihiddin Nureddinzade who is buried locally in his own mosque and dergah.

Vefa lies to the east of busy Atatürk Bulvari, the main road pushed through the old city by the French architect Henri Prost in the 1950s. Immediately to its north is the area of Küçükpazarı while to the east is the Süleymaniye district around the huge Süleymaniye Mosque complex.

Buses link Vefa to Taksim, Eminönü, Fatih and Beyazıt. The Vezneciler Metro stop on the M2 line is a short walk away as is the Cibali tram stop on the Golden Horn.

== Attractions ==
Vefa is best known for the Vefa Bozacısı shop, the oldest shop (founded in 1876) still selling boza, a barley drink usually topped off with chickpeas, in the city.Atatürk came here to drink boza and his cup is preserved in a showcase in the wall. The shop is mentioned several times in Orhan Pamuk's novel, A Strangeness in my Mind which tells the story of an itinerant boza-seller.

The Vefa Kilise Mosque (Vefa Church Mosque) is a small Byzantine church in the same area, probably originally dedicated to Hagios Theodoros (St Theodore). It dates back to the Middle Byzantine period of architecture in the 10th to 11th centuries. The church had been allowed to fall into complete neglect . However it has now been completely restored. Near the church is the brick-and-stone Atif Efendi Library, the second library to be built in Ottoman Constantinople in the 1740s. It, too, has been restored. Another early 18th-century library, commissioned by Damad Şehir Ali Paşa, stands in the grounds of Vefa High School (Vefa Lisesi), designed by architect Kemalettin Bey in the 1920s.

Not far from Vefa Bozacısı is the Recai Mehmed Efendi sibyan mektep, an Ottoman primary school opened in 1775, its facade entirely covered in marble carvings that incorporate fountains and a sebil from which drinks were dispensed to passers-by. Nearby is the Ekmekcizade Ahmed Paşa Medresesi, an Ottoman theological school built around 1618 for a vizier of the sultan.

Near Vezneciler Metro stop is the large Kalenderhane Mosque which was built as the Middle Byzantine church of Theotokos Kyriotissa and stands beside the remains of an early Byzantine bathhouse. Running along one side of the church is a stretch of the Aqueduct of Valens which used to bring water into the city from Thrace (Trakya) in Roman and Byzantine times.

Vefa is also home to Vefa S.K., one of Istanbul's historic soccer clubs.

== In popular culture ==
The life of Şeyh Muslihiddin Nureddinzade is portrayed in TRT 1 TV Series Vefa Sultan and his character is played by İsmail Ege Şaşmaz.

== Gallery ==
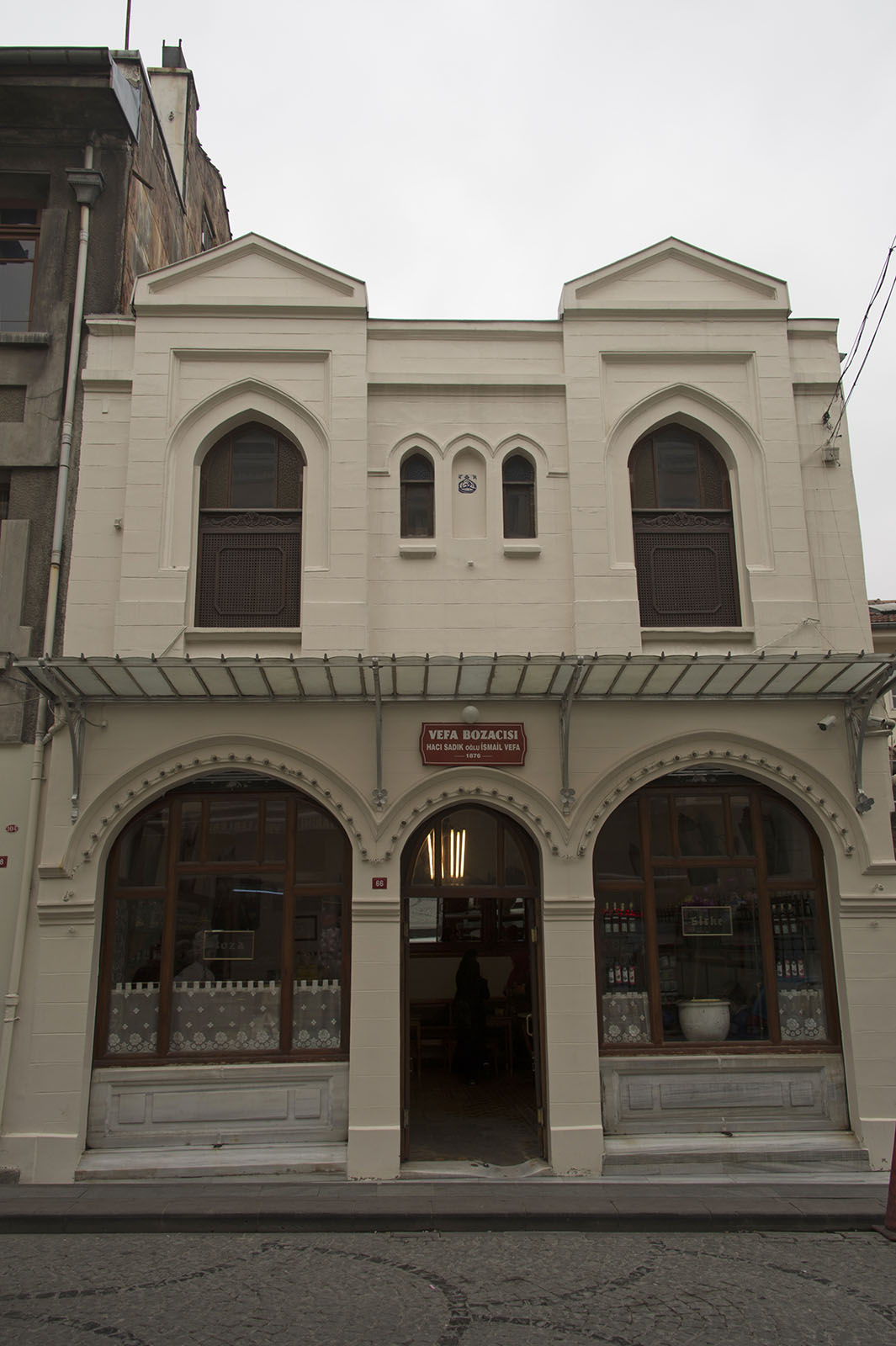
Istanbul Vefa Bozaci Shop

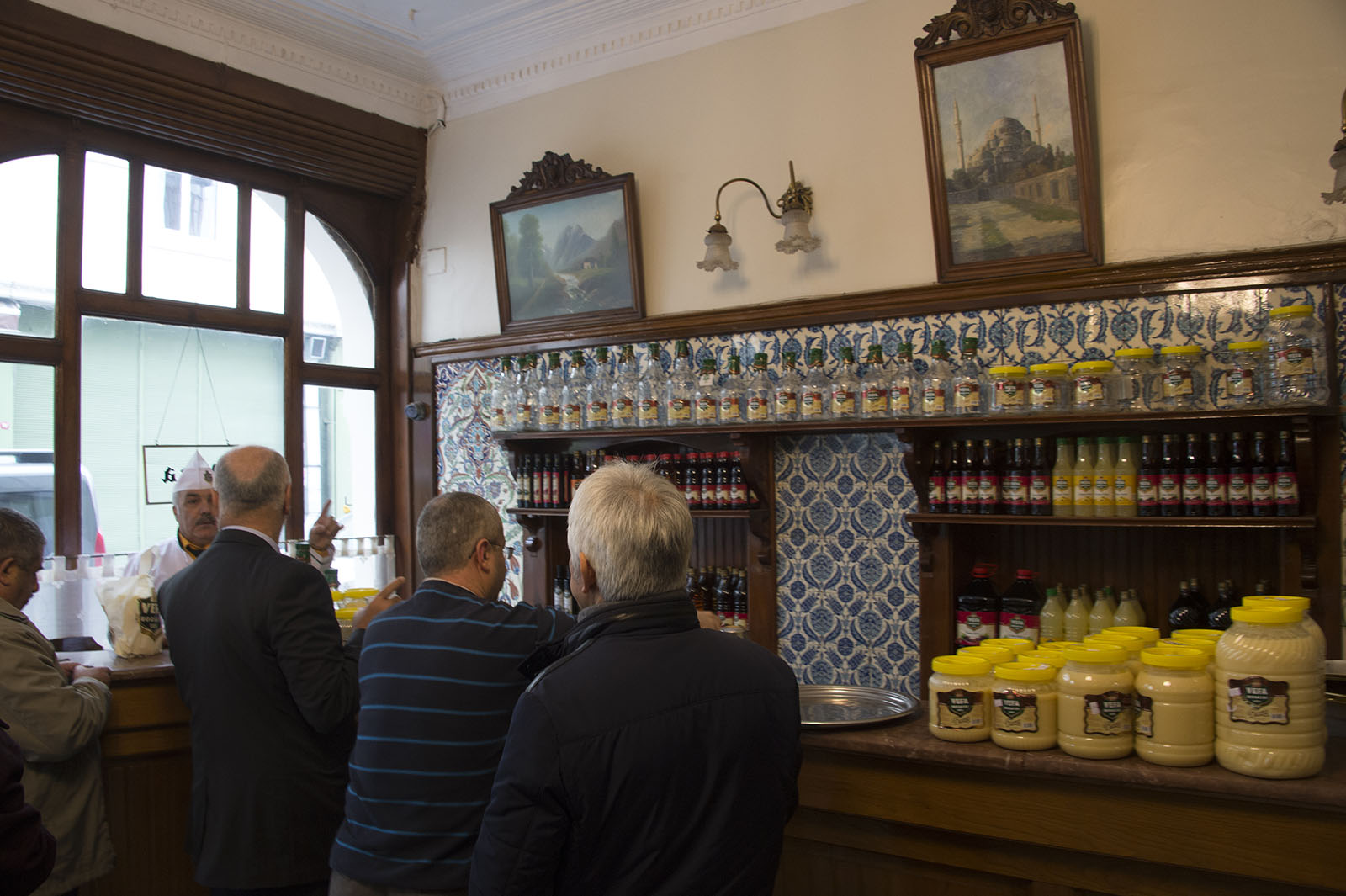
Istanbul Vefa Bozaci counter area

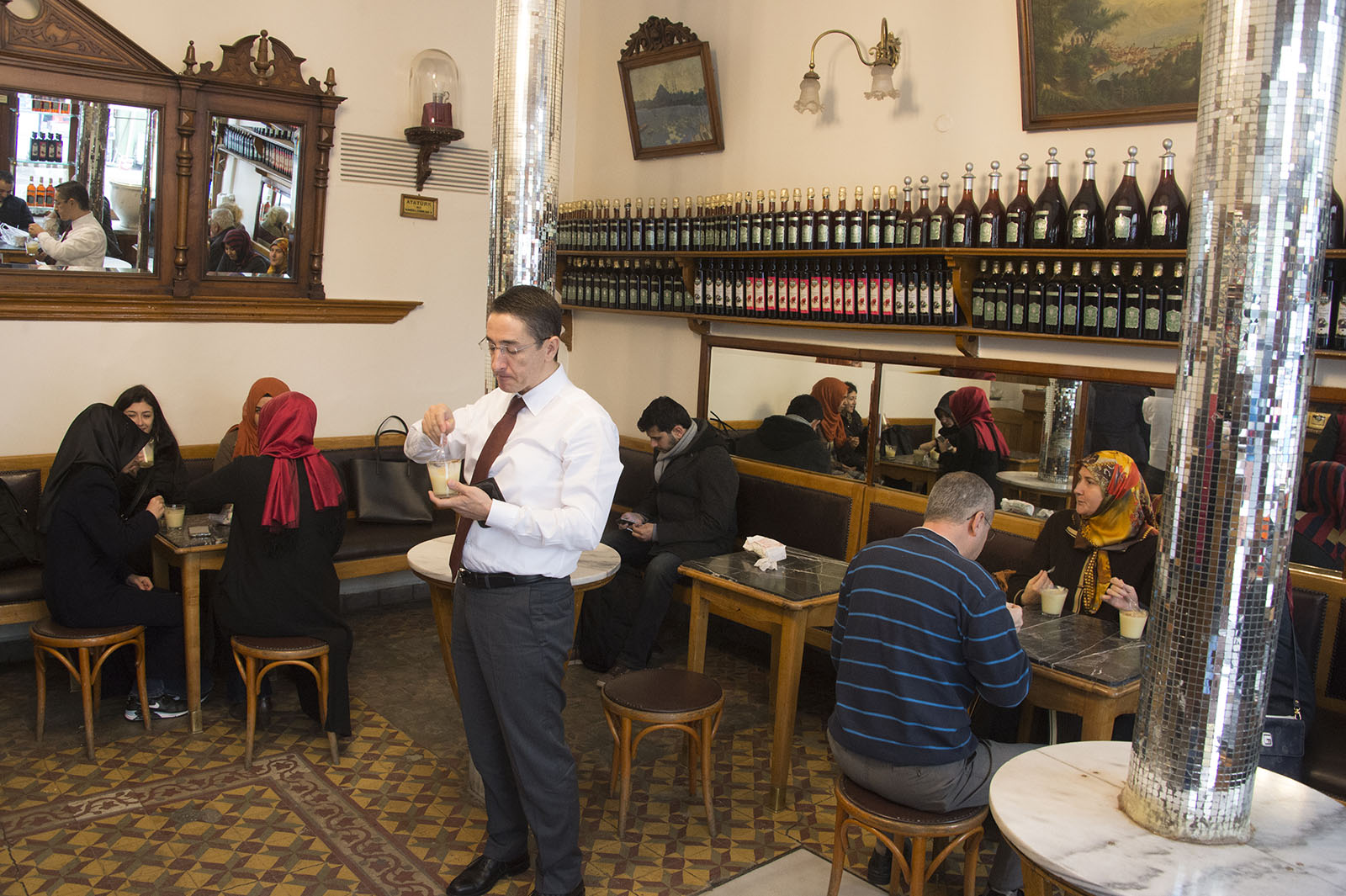
Istanbul Vefa Bozaci interior

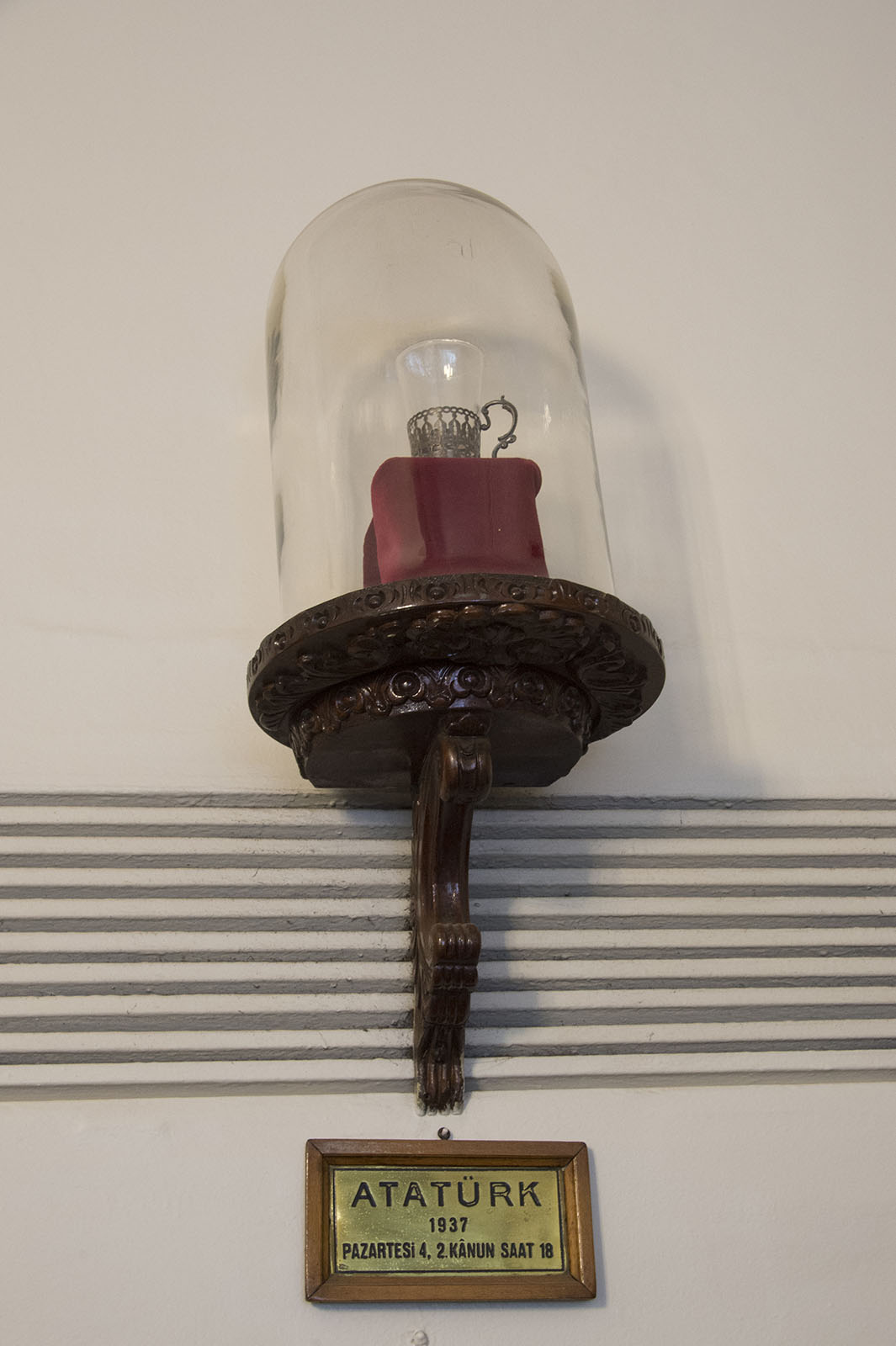
Istanbul Vefa Bozaci: Glass used by Atatürk

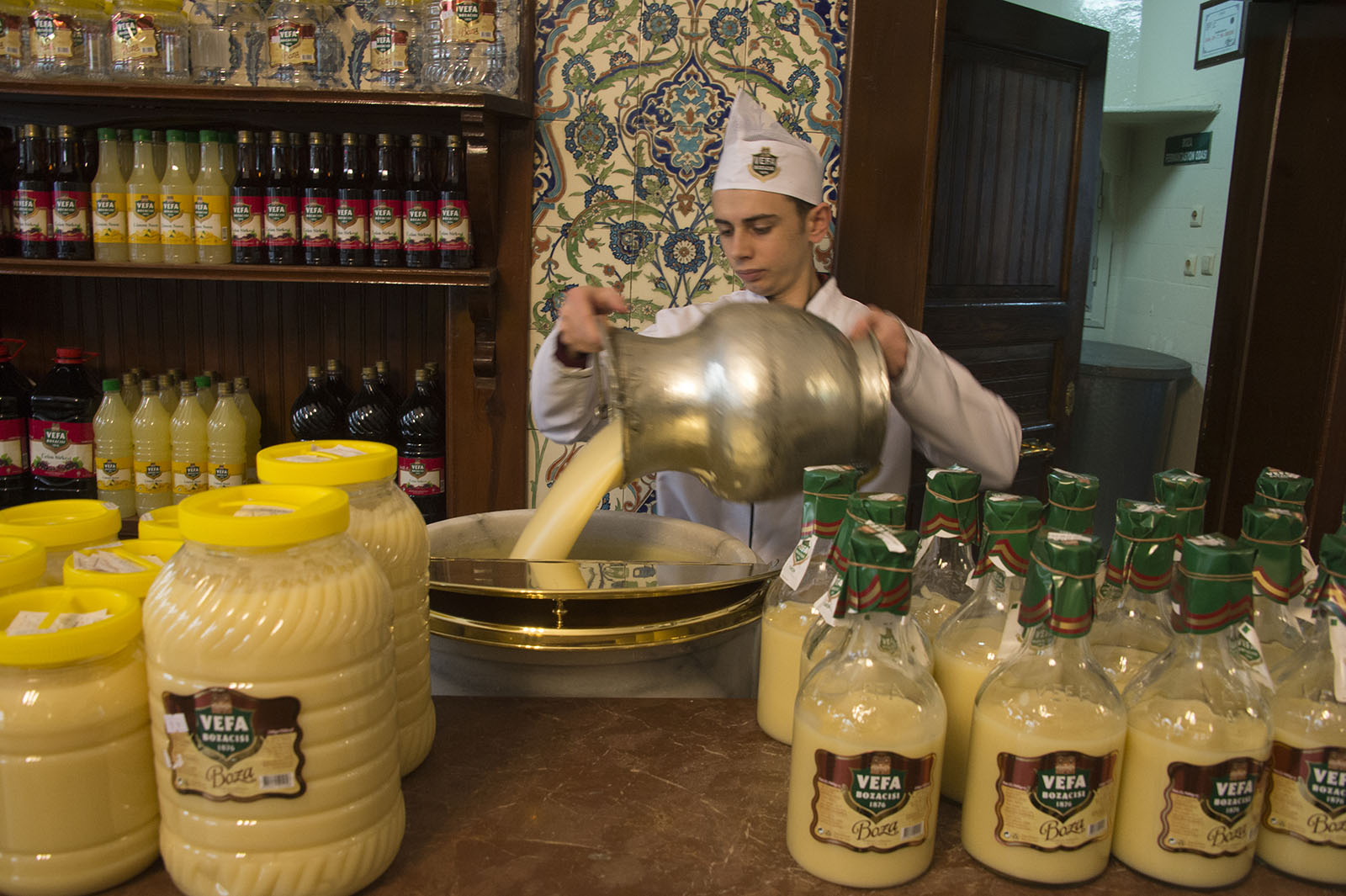
Istanbul Vefa Bozaci

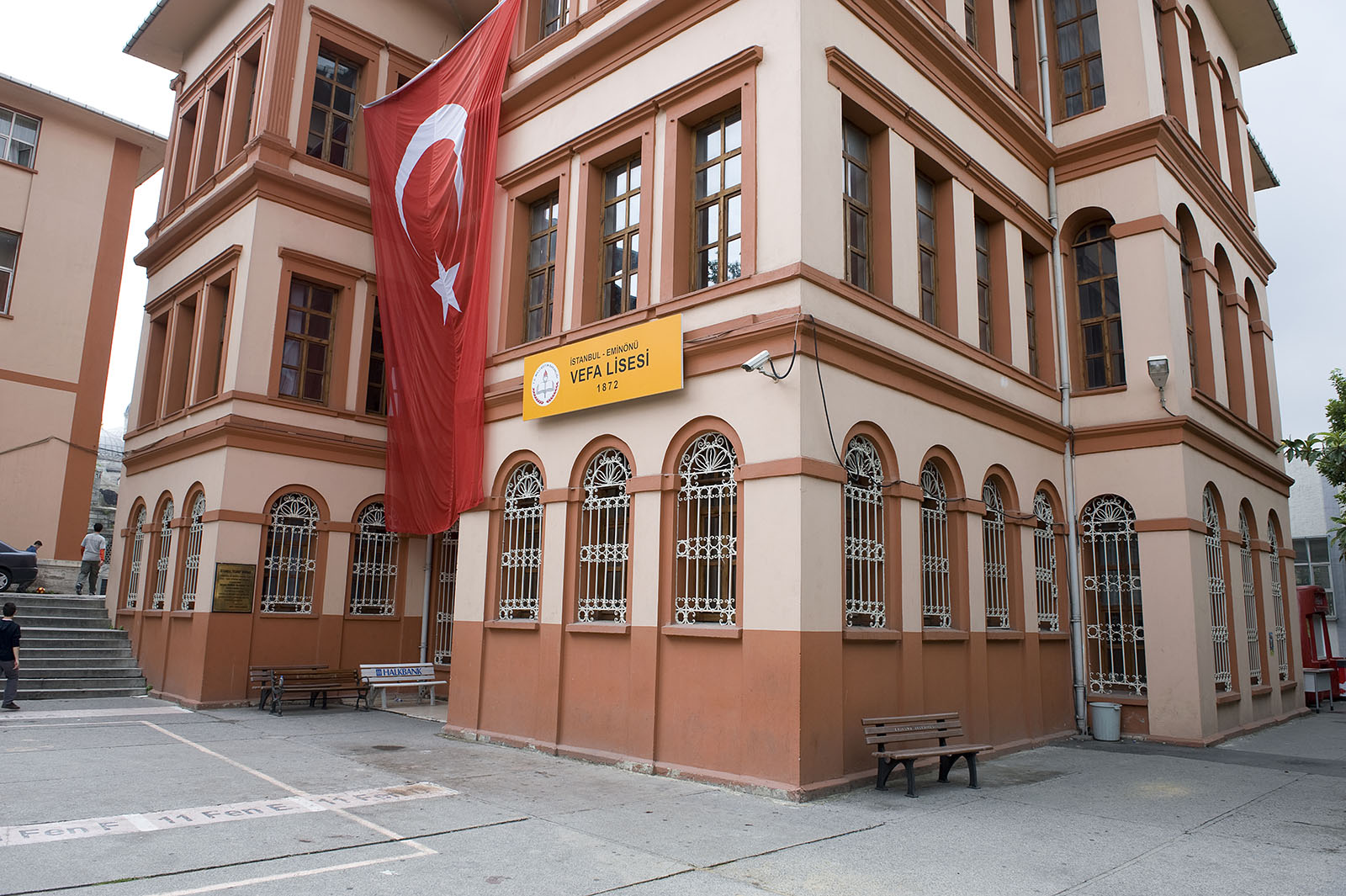
Vefa High School
