= Kaloyanovo Municipality =

Municipality in Plovdiv Province, Bulgaria

Coordinates: 42°21′25″N 24°43′56″E

Kaloyanovo Municipality (Bulgarian: Община Калояново) is a municipality in the Plovdiv Province, central Bulgaria and covers an area of 347 km². As of 2006 it has 12,390 inhabitants. The center of the municipality is the village of Kaloyanovo.

It is a flat country with some hilly areas to the north where the southern slopes of Sredna Gora begin. The climate is continental. The precipitation is around Bulgaria's average and is favourable for intensive agriculture. There are 21 reservoirs for irrigation and fishing.

== Religion ==
Some of the inhabitants of the municipality are Catholics and the rest are Orthodox Christians. The Catholic villages are Zhitnitsa and Duvanlii as well as 1,100 of the inhabitants of Kaloyanovo.

According to the latest Bulgarian census of 2011, the religious composition, among those who answered the optional question on religious identification, was the following:

Religious composition of Municipality
Orthodox Christianity	65.1%
Catholicism	23.5%
Protestantism	0.4%
Islam	5.8%
No religion	2.7%
Prefer not to answer, others and indefinable	2.5%
