= Kalenderhane Mosque =

Mosque in Istanbul, Turkey

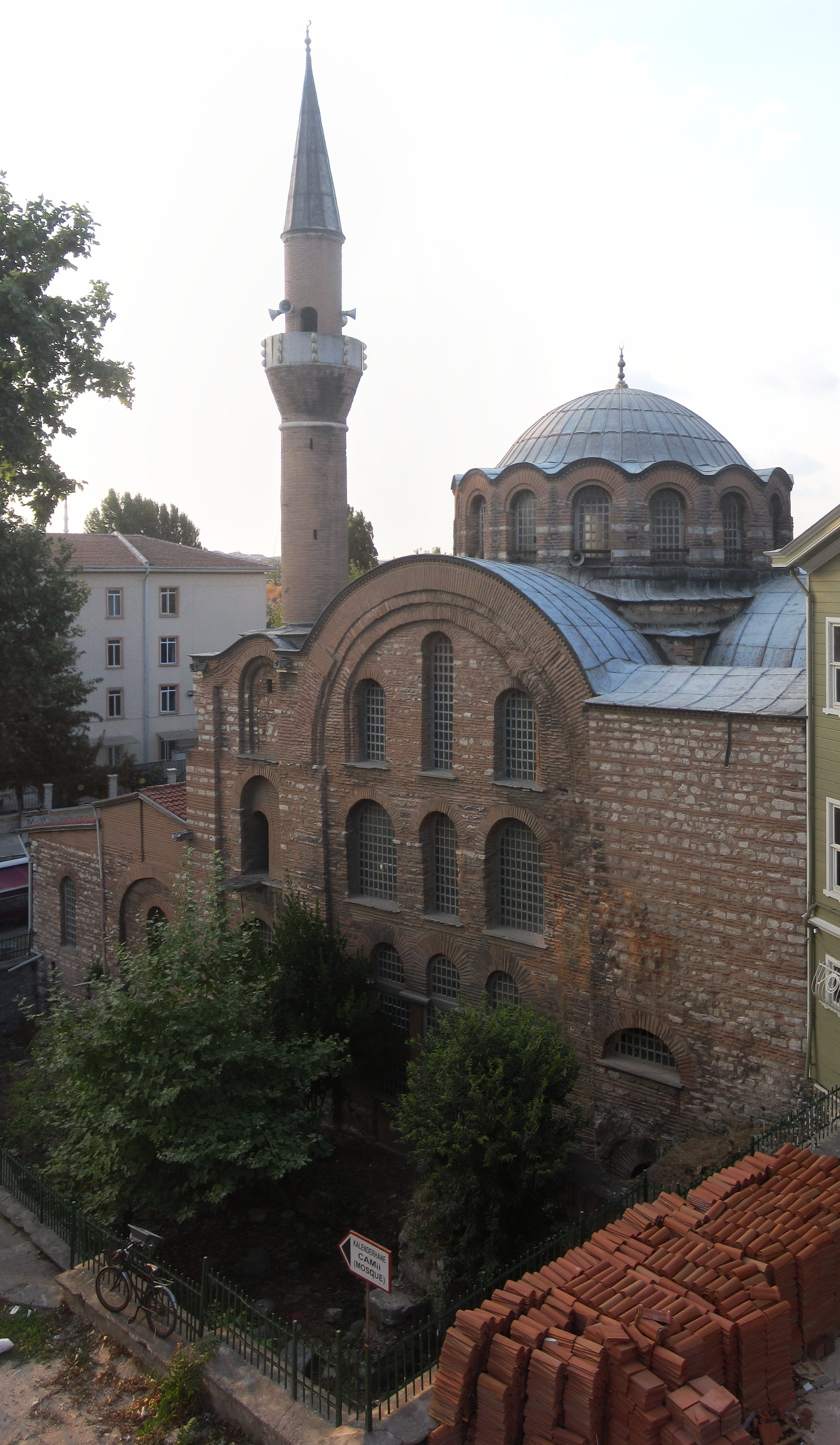
- The Mosque viewed from the southeast in 2012

- Location in the Fatih district of Istanbul

Religion
- Affiliation: Sunni Islam
- Year consecrated: 1746

Location
- Location: Istanbul, Turkey
- Coordinates: 41.013132°N 28.960304°E

Architecture
- Type: Church with Greek cross plan
- Style: Middle Byzantine - Comnenian
- Completed: 12th century
- Minaret: 1

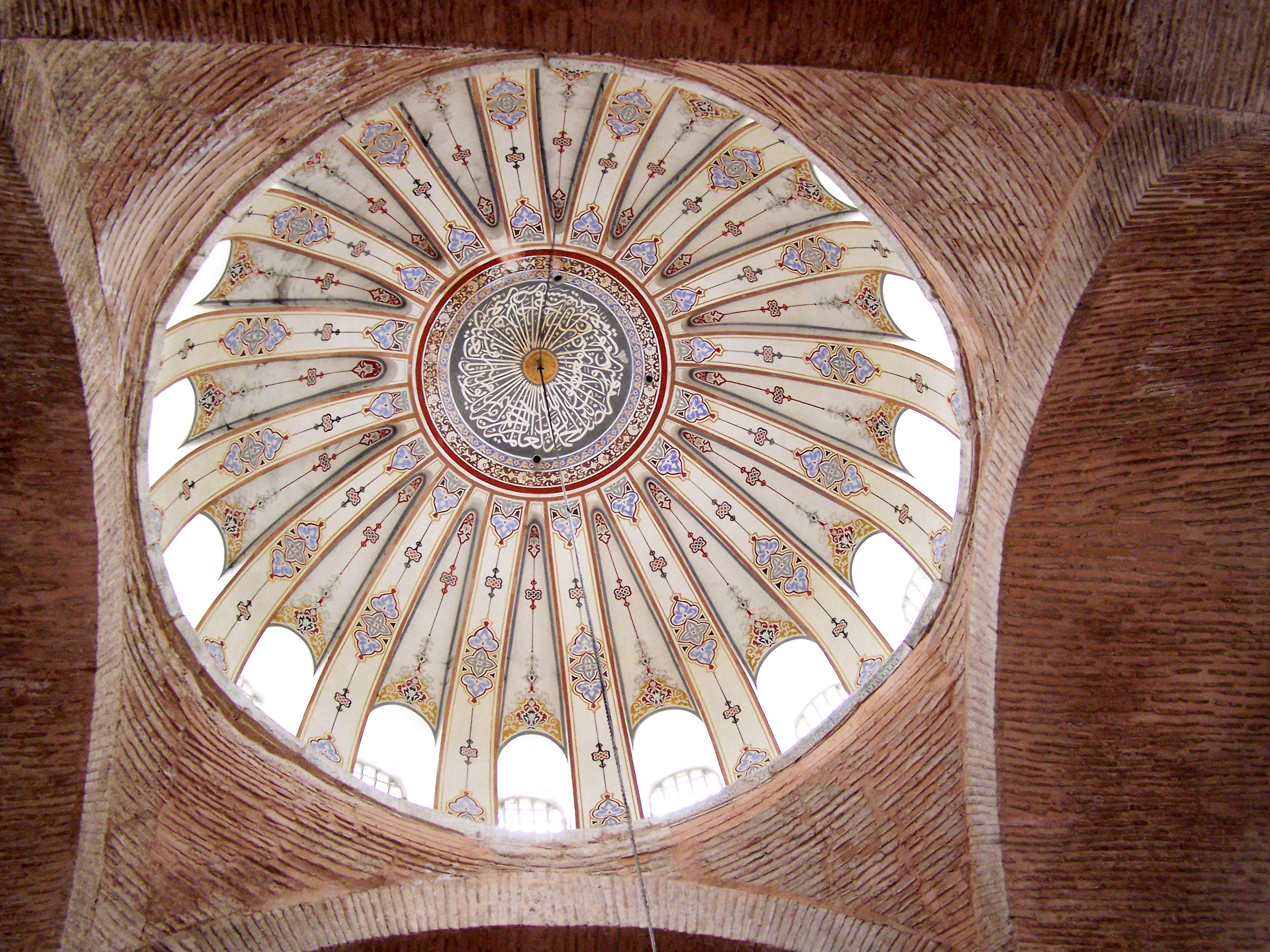
Dome of the mosque

Kalenderhane Mosque (Turkish: Kalenderhane Camii) is a former Eastern Orthodox church in Istanbul, Turkey, converted into a mosque by the Ottomans. With high probability the church was originally dedicated to the Theotokos Kyriotissa. The building is sometimes referred to as Kalender Haneh Jamissi and St. Mary Diaconissa. This building represents one among the few extant examples of a Byzantine church with domed Greek cross plan.

== Location ==
The mosque is located in the Fatih district of Istanbul, Turkey, in the picturesque neighborhood of Vefa, and lies immediately to the south of the easternmost extant section of the aqueduct of Valens, and less than one km to the southeast of the Vefa Kilise Mosque.

== History ==
The first building on this site was a Roman bath, followed by a sixth-century (the dating was based on precise coin finds in stratigraphic excavation) hall church with an apse laying up against the Aqueduct of Valens. Later – possibly in the seventh century – a much larger church was built to the south of the first church. A third church, which reused the sanctuary and the apse (later destroyed by the Ottomans) of the second one, can be dated to the end of the twelfth century, during the late Comnenian period. It may date to between 1197 and 1204, since Constantine Stilbes alluded to its destruction in a fire in 1197. The church was surrounded by monastery buildings, which disappeared totally during the Ottoman period. After the Latin conquest of Constantinople, the building was used by the Crusaders as a Roman Catholic church, and partly officiated by Franciscan clergy.

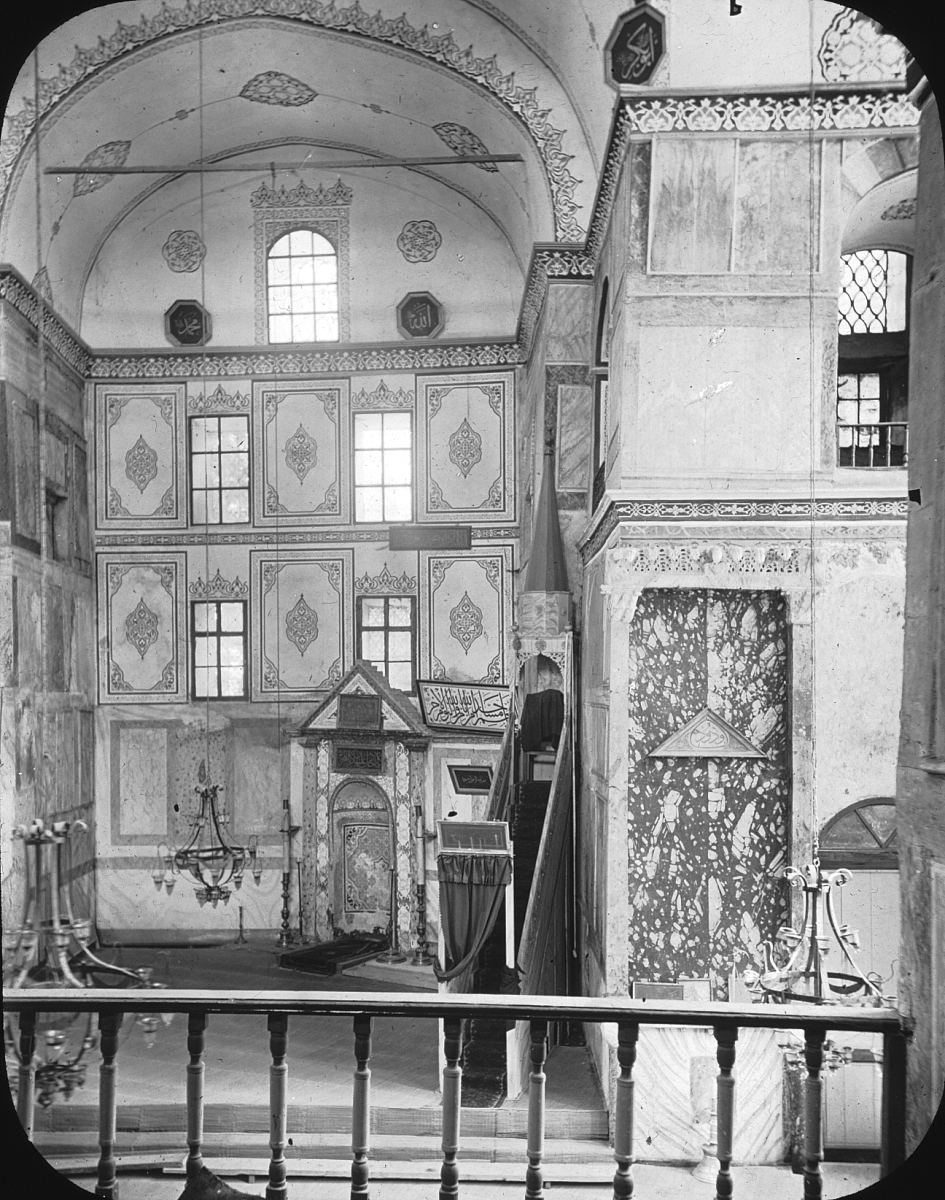
Interior of Kalenderhane Mosque taken from the gallery looking towards the choir. St. Mary Diaconissa, Istanbul, Turkey, 1903. St. Mary Diaconissa; Series 1903; View from right gallery; Century 36. Brooklyn Museum Archives, Goodyear Archival Collection

After the conquest of Constantinople in 1453, the church was assigned personally by Mehmed II to the Kalenderi sect of the Dervish. The Dervishes used it as a zaviye and imaret (public kitchen), and the building has been known since as Kalenderhane (Turkish: "The house of the Kalenderi").

The Waqf (foundation) was endowed with several properties in Thrace, and many hamams in Istanbul and Galata. Some years later, Arpa Emini Mustafa Efendi built a Mektep (school) and a Medrese.

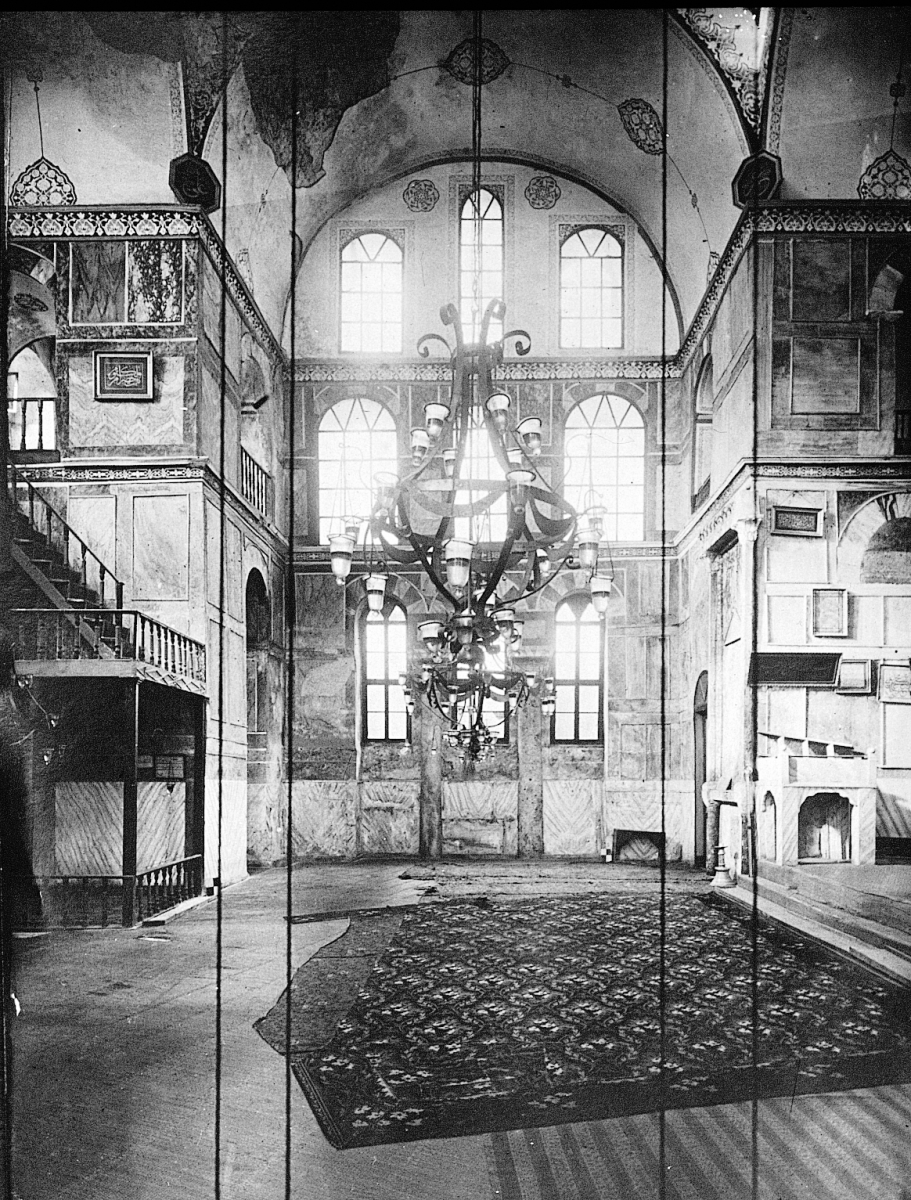
Interior of Kalenderhane Mosque from 1903. Diaconissa, Istanbul, Turkey, 1914. [Survey 1914. Istanbul; Diaconissa]; Sebah & Joaillier. Phot. Brooklyn Museum Archives, Goodyear Archival Collection

In 1746, Hacı Beşir Ağa (d. 1747), the Kizlar Ağası of the Topkapı Palace, built a mihrab, minbar and mahfil, completing the conversion of the building into a mosque. Ravaged by fire and damaged by earthquakes, the mosque was restored in 1855 and again between 1880 and 1890. It was abandoned in the 1930s, after the collapse of the minaret due to lightning, and the demolition of the Medrese.

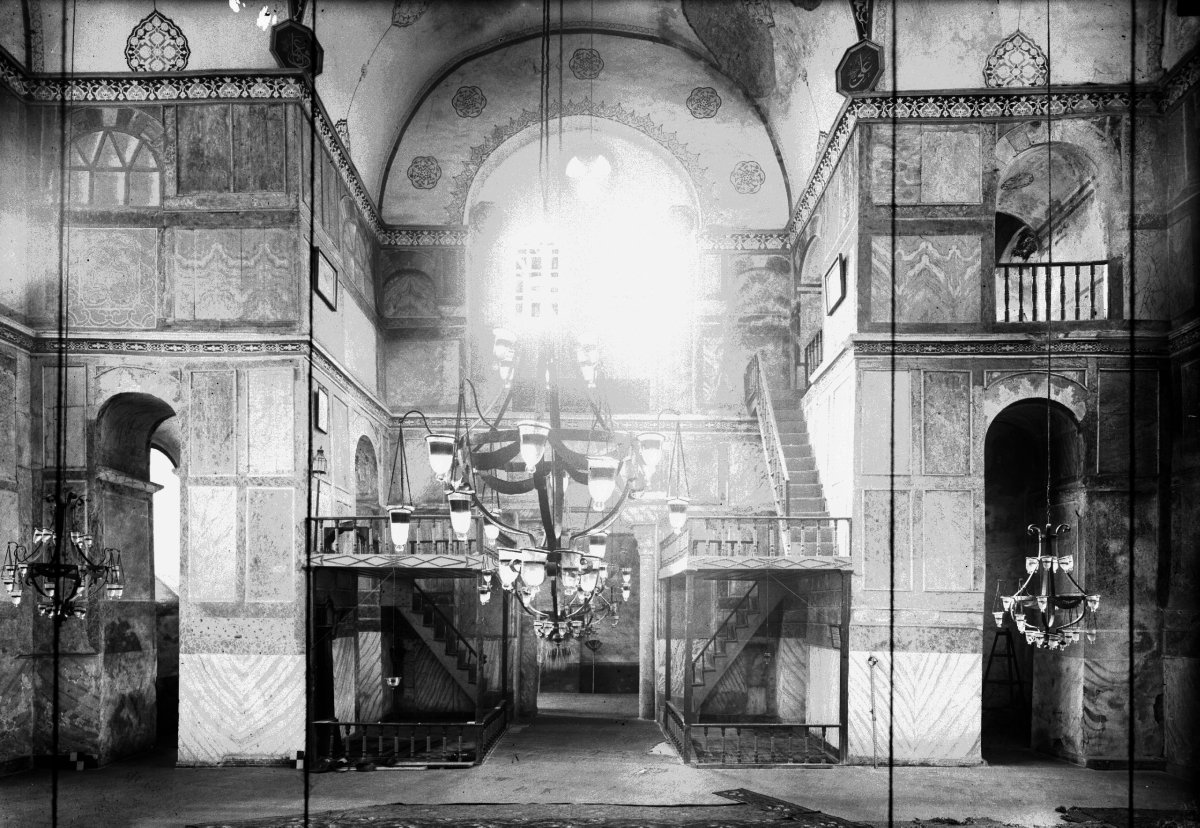
View from the choir looking towards the entrance. Diaconissa, Istanbul, Turkey, 1914. Description partially transcribed from negative envelope (discarded). Vintage print has #22 on back. Brooklyn Museum Archives, Goodyear Archival Collection

The conservation of the building dates from the 1970s, when it was extensively restored and studied in a ten-year effort by Cecil L. Striker and Doğan Kuban, who restored its twelfth-century condition. Moreover, the minaret and the mihrab were rebuilt, which allowed the mosque to reopen for worship.

The restoration also provided a solution to the problem of the dedication of the church: while before it was thought that the church was named after Theotokos tēs Diakonissēs ("Virgin of the Deaconesses") or Christos ho Akatalēptos ("Christ the Inconceivable"), the discovery of a donor fresco in the southeastern chapel and of another fresco over the main entrance to the narthex both bearing the word "Kyriotissa" (Greek for Enthroned), makes it highly probable that the church was dedicated to the Theotokos Kyriotissa.

== Architecture and decoration ==
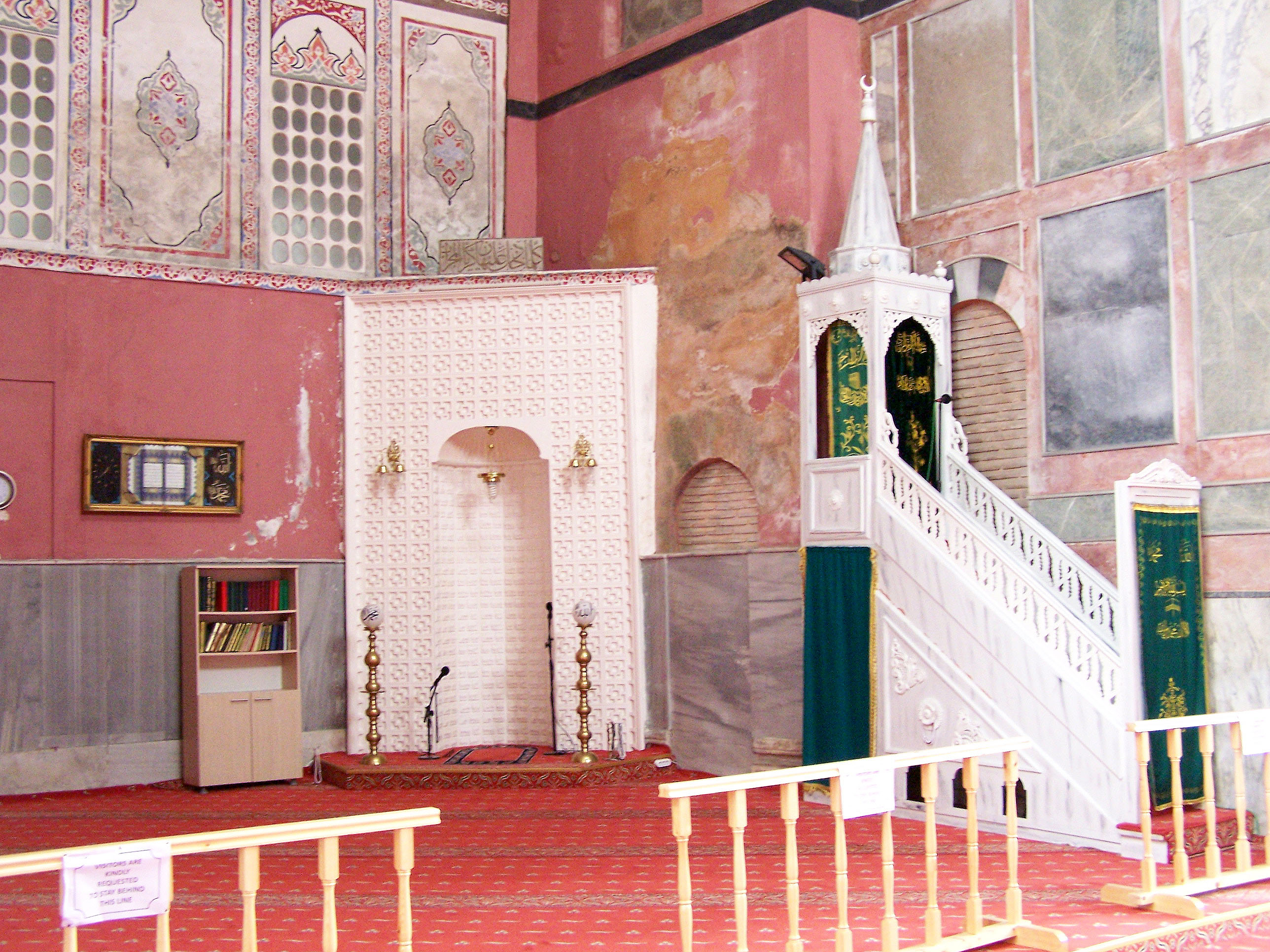
The sanctuary with the mihrab and minbar

The building has a central Greek Cross plan with deep barrel vaults over the arms, and is surmounted by a dome with 16 ribs. The structure has a typically middle Byzantine brickwork with alternating layers of brick and stone masonry. The entry is via an esonarthex and an exonarthex (added much later) in the west side.

An upper gallery over the esonarthex, following the same plan of the one existing in the Church of the Pantokrator, was removed in 1854. Also the north and south aisles along the nave were destroyed, possibly during the nineteenth century too. The tall triple arches connecting the aisles with the nave are now the lower windows of the church.

The sanctuary is on the east side; however, the reconstructed mihrab and minbar are in a corner to obtain the proper alignment with Mecca.

Two small chapels named prothesis and diakonikon, typical of the Byzantine churches of the middle and late period have survived.

The interior decoration of the church, consisting of beautiful colored marble panels and moldings, and of elaborated icon frames, is largely extant. The building possesses two features which both represent a unicum in Istanbul: a mosaic, one meter square, representing the "Presentation of Christ", which is the only pre-iconoclastic exemplar of a religious subject surviving in the city, and a cycle of frescoes of the thirteenth century (found in a chapel at the southeast corner of the building, and painted during the Latin domination) portraying the life of Saint Francis of Assisi. This is the oldest known representation of the saint, and may have been painted only a few years after his death in 1226. Both have now been detached and partially restored, and can be seen in the Archaeological Museum of Istanbul.

As a whole, the mosque of Kalenderhane represents – together with the Gül Mosque in Istanbul, the Church of Hagia Sophia in Thessaloniki and the Church of the Dormition in (Koimesis) in Iznik (Nicaea), one of the main architectural examples of a domed Greek cross church from the Byzantine middle period.

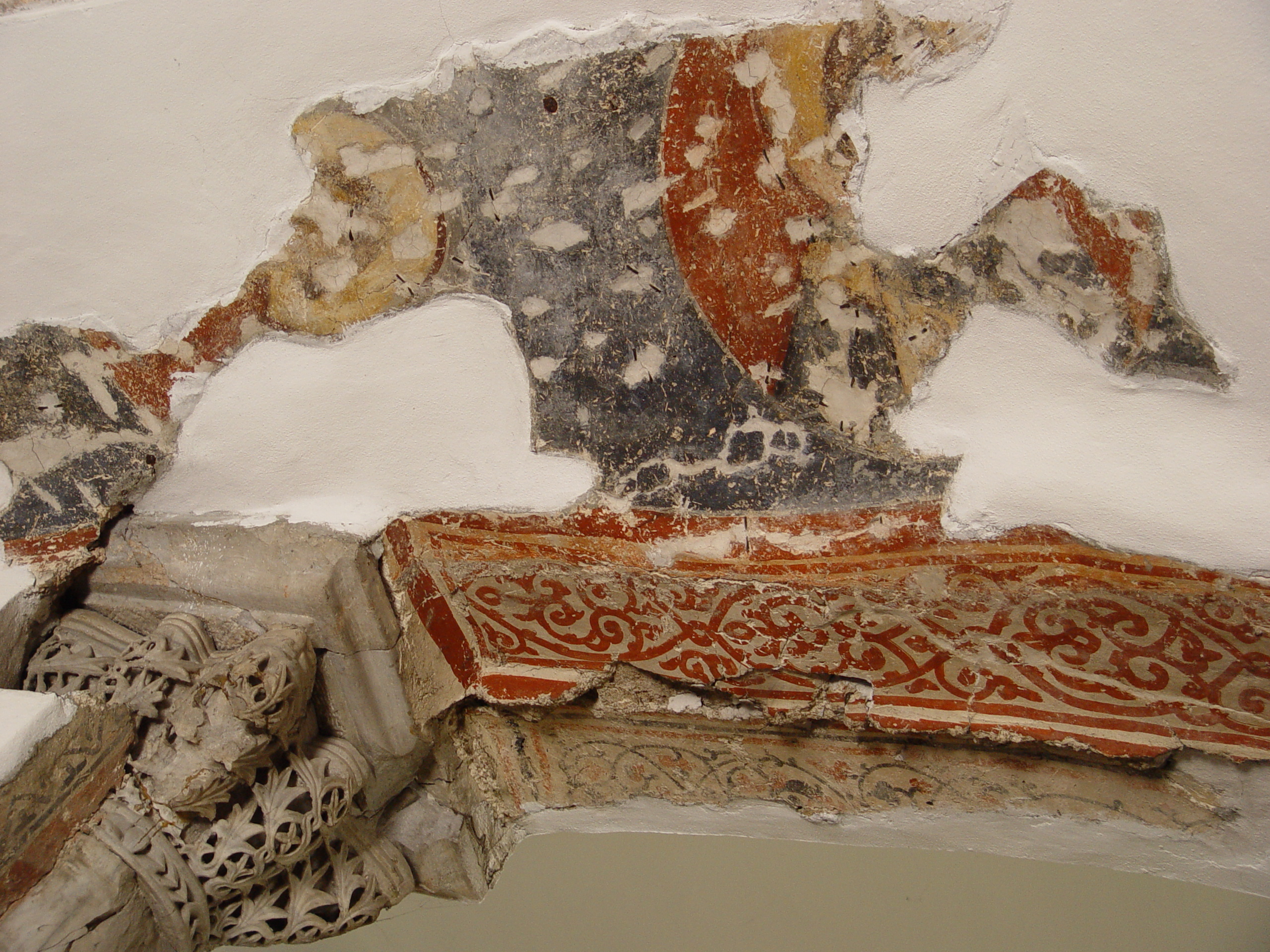
Kalenderhane Mosque fresco

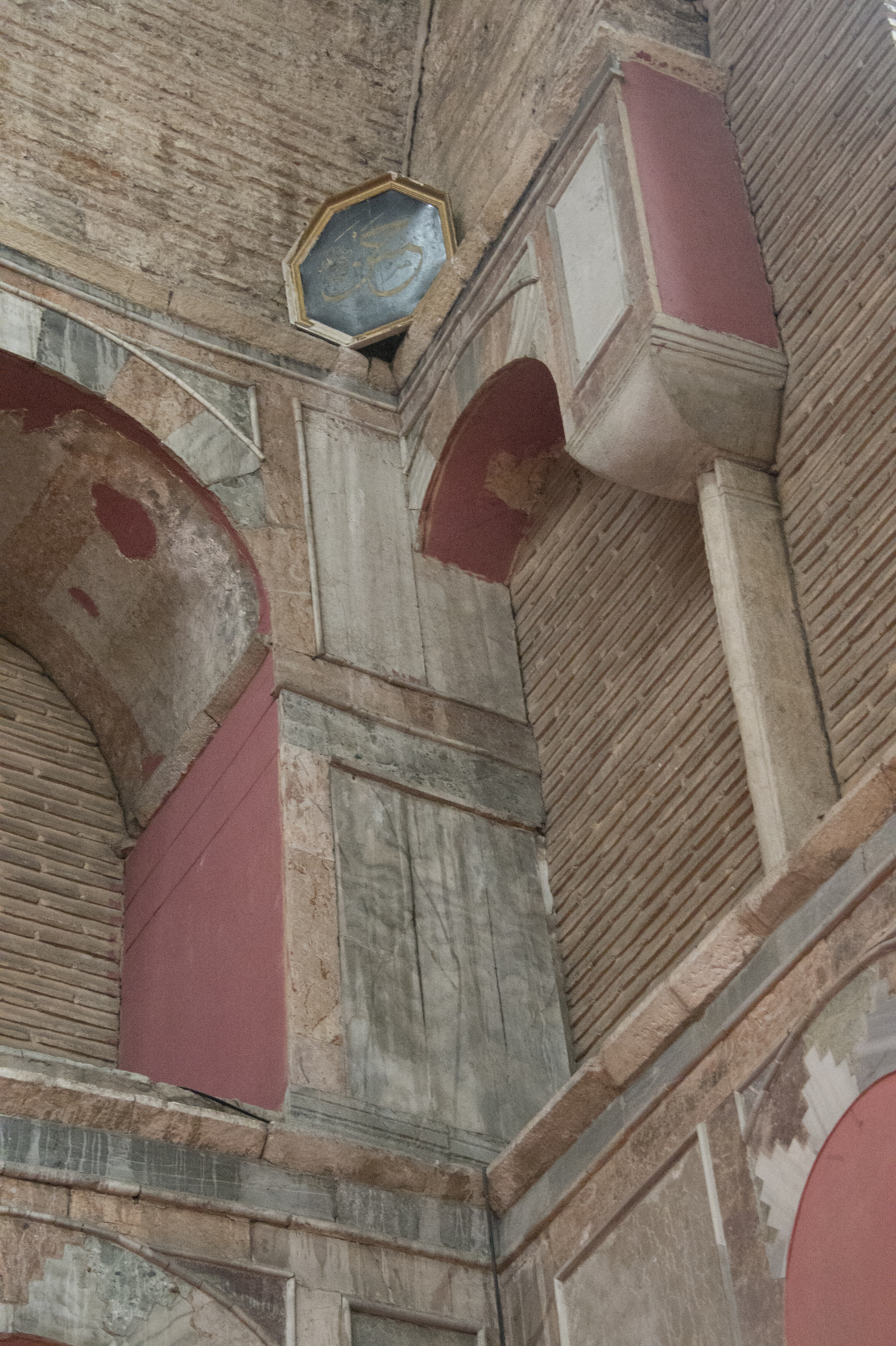
Kalenderhane Mosque interior

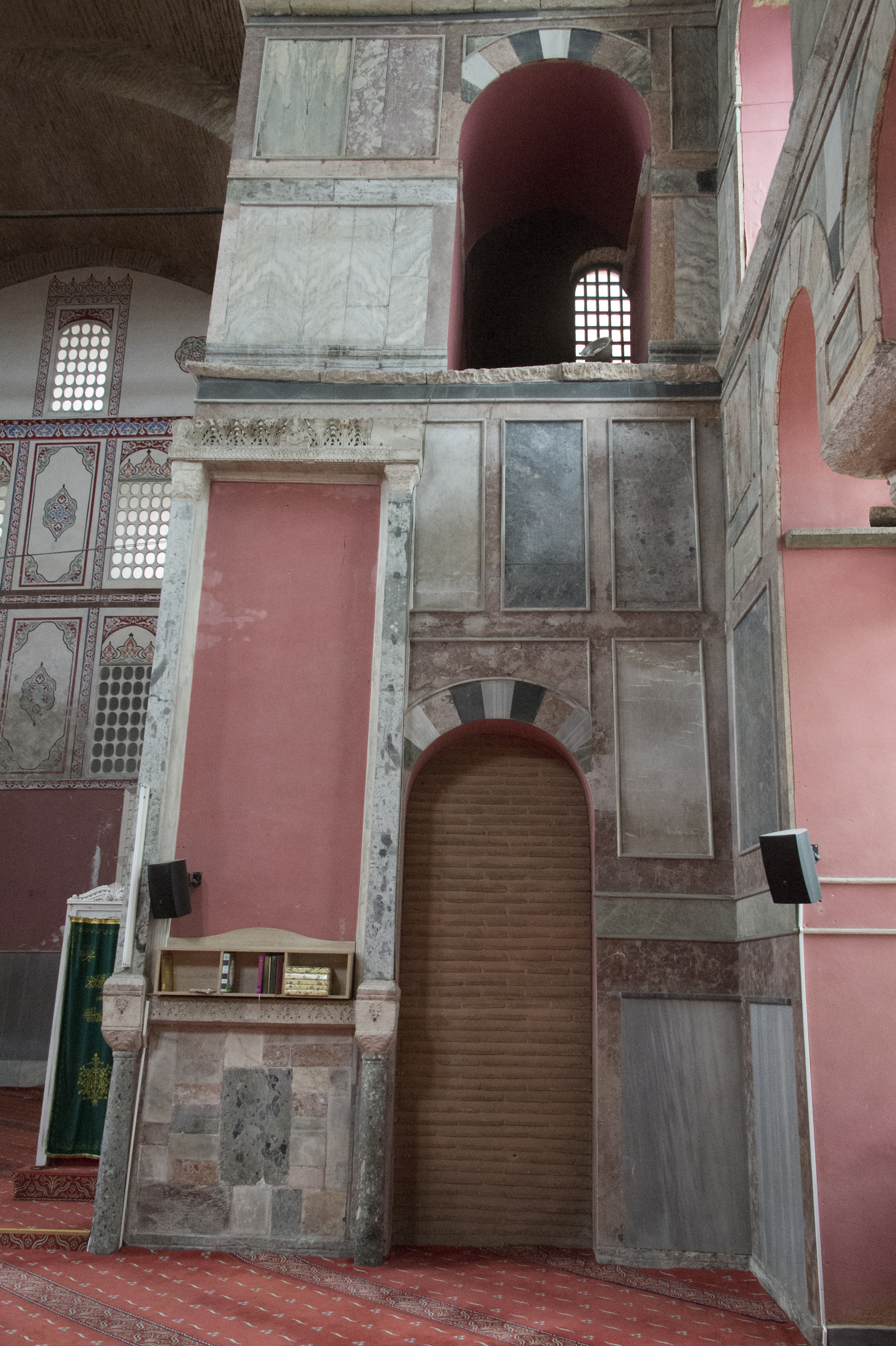
Kalenderhane Mosque interior

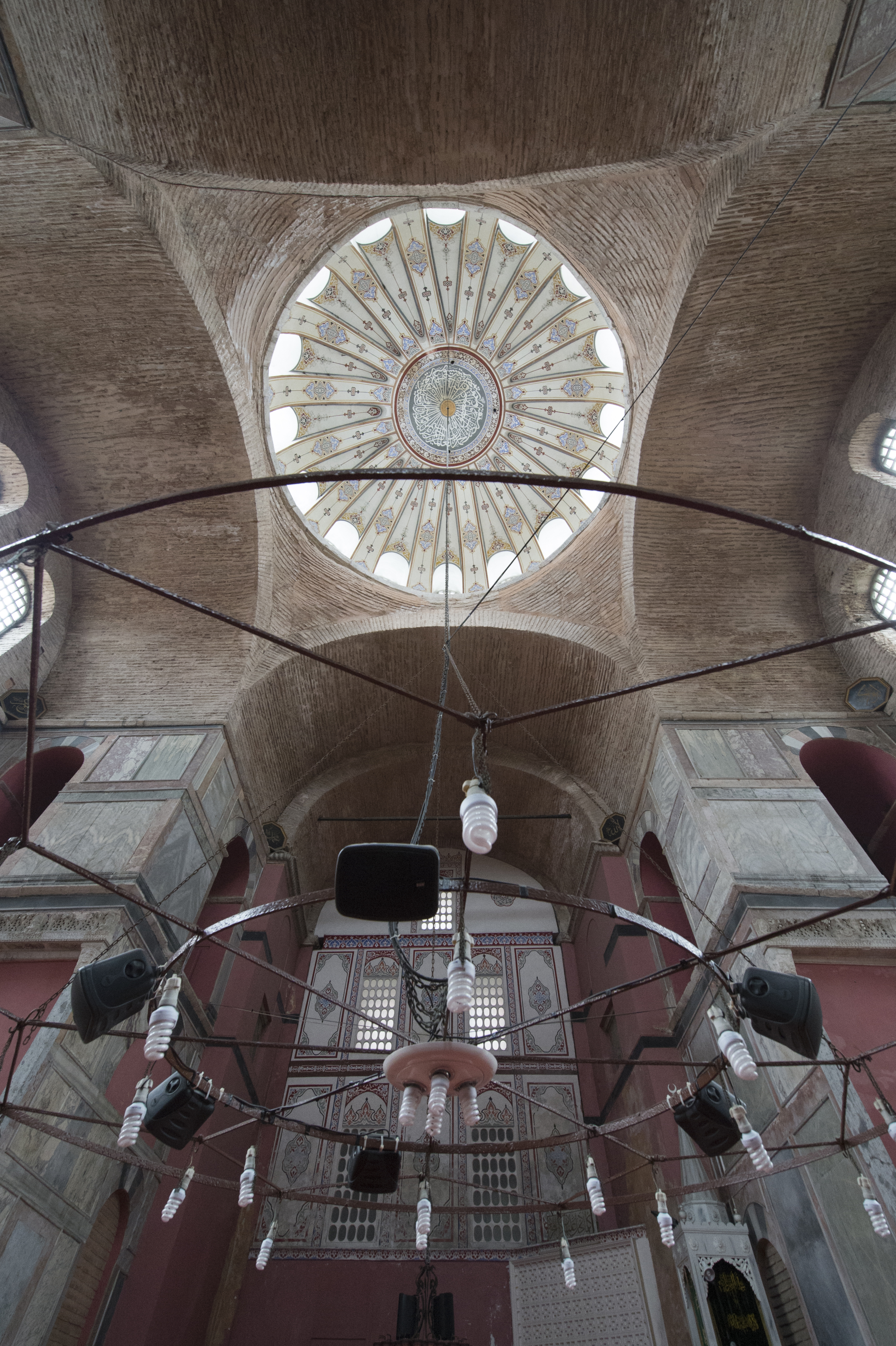
Kalenderhane Mosque interior with dome

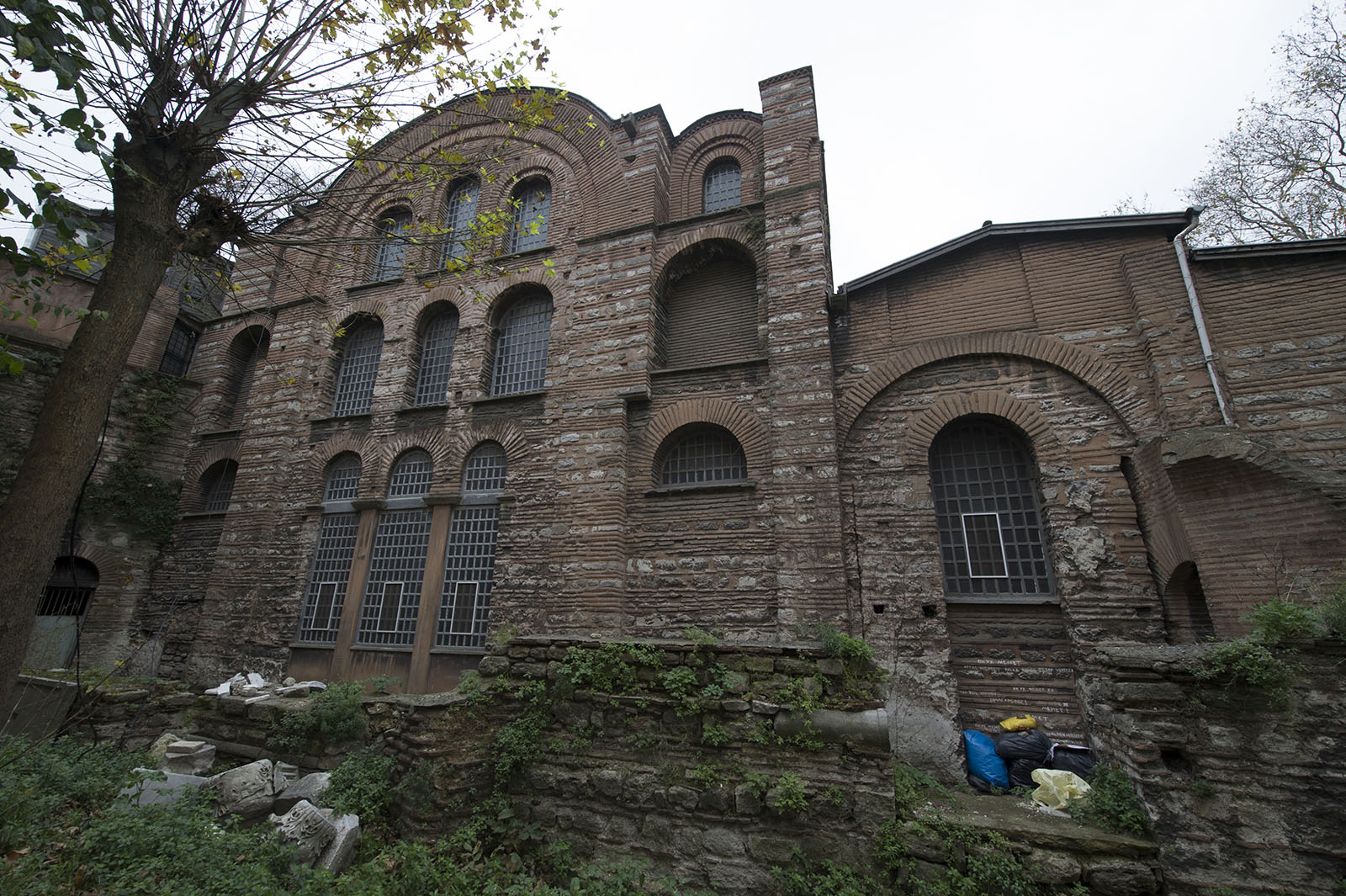
Kalenderhane Mosque exterior

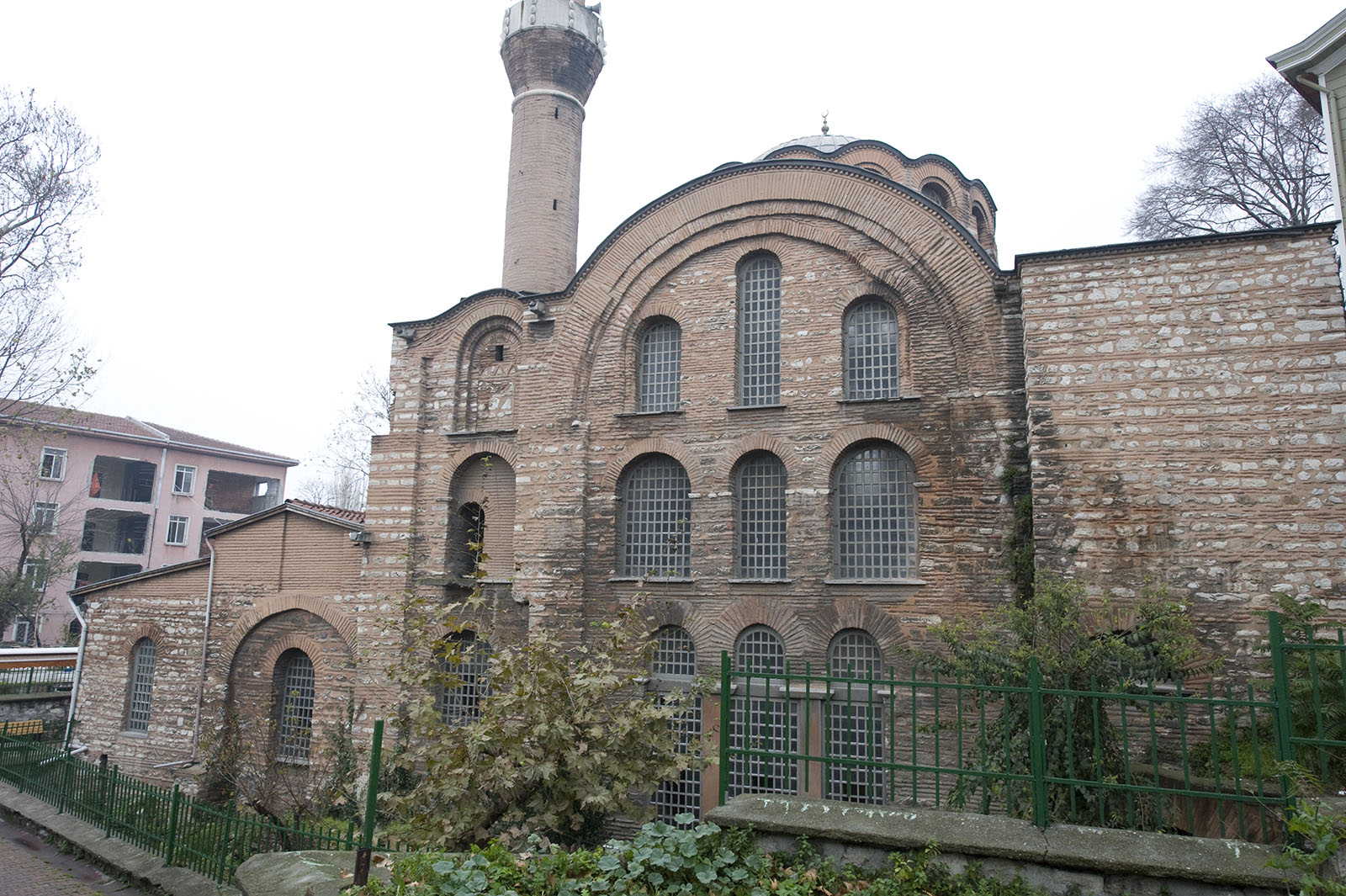
Kalenderhane Mosque exterior

== See also ==
- Ancient Roman and Byzantine domes
