= Zhitnitsa, Plovdiv Province =

Zhitnitsa Житница
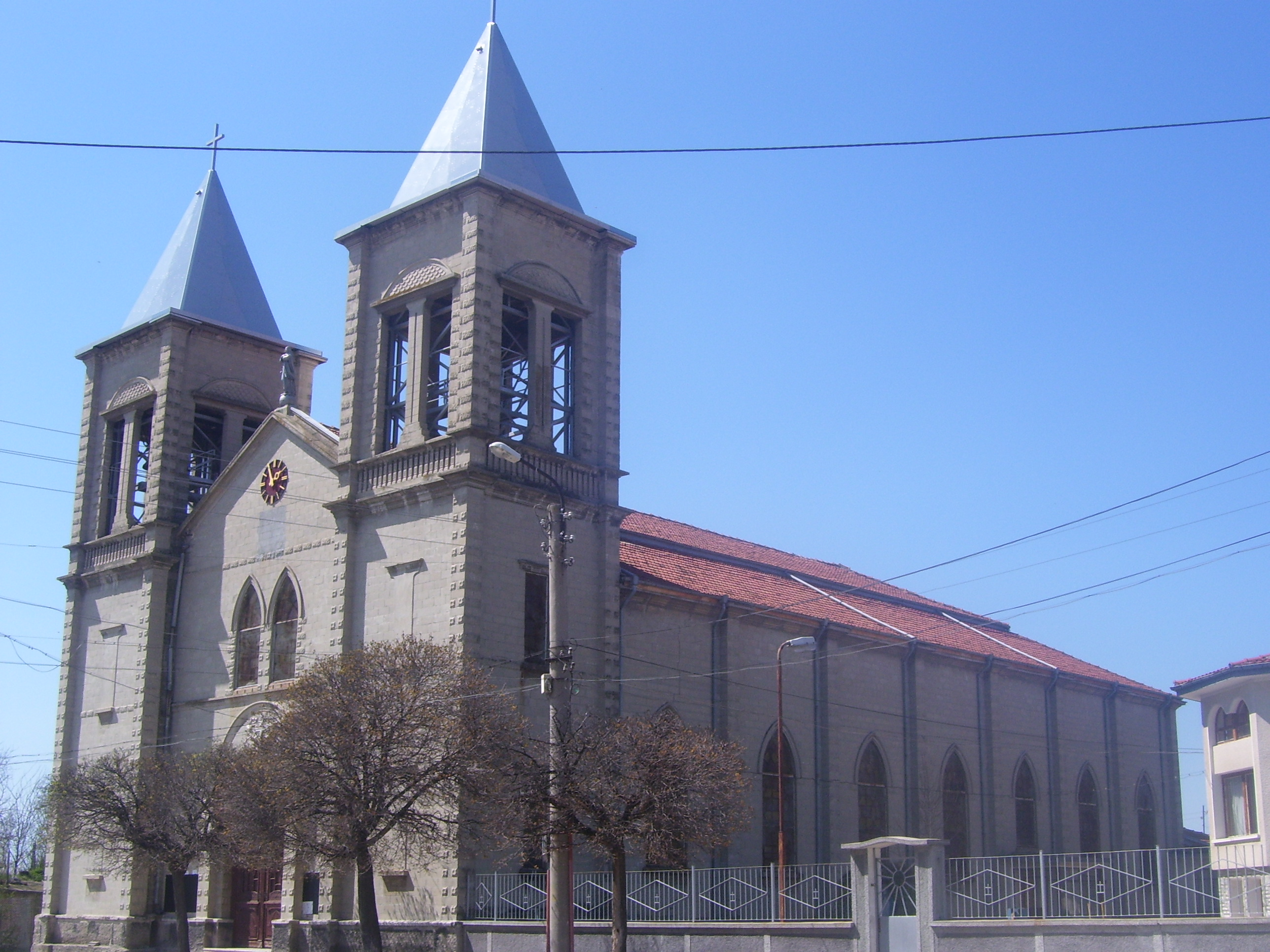
- The Roman Catholic church in Zhitnitsa

- Location of Zhitnitsa
- Coordinates: 42°22′N 24°42′E
- Country: Bulgaria
- Provinces (Oblast): Plovdiv

Government
  - Mayor: Tsetska Yotova
- Elevation: 232 m (761 ft)

Population (2020)
  - Total: 1,474
- Time zone: UTC+2 (EET)
  - Summer (DST): UTC+3 (EEST)
- Postal Code: 4172
- Area code: 031703

Zhitnitsa (Bulgarian: Житница, "granary") is a village in central southern Bulgaria, part of Kaloyanovo Municipality, Plovdiv Province. Zhitnitsa is mostly inhabited by Roman Catholic Bulgarians, descendants of medieval Paulicians. It lies 30 kilometres (19 mi) north of Plovdiv and 5 kilometres (3.1 mi) from the municipal centre Kaloyanovo.

== History ==
Ottoman sources from the 17th century refer to an early sixteenth-century village in the approximate area by the name of Anbarli, province Göpsi, which may be a reference to Zhitnitsa. Until 1934, the village was known as Hambarlii, a possible cognate to Anbarli. Zhitnitsa appears to have been founded no later than 1646, during the Ottoman rule of Bulgaria, as a Turkish-owned farm. The farm was worked by Bulgarian Paulicians from Sopot and Kalabrovo who settled in the vicinity and established the village. According to an 18th-century report by papal missionary Nikola Radovani, the village had 54 houses inhabited by 341 Catholics, though an Eastern Orthodox population was also present. The construction of the first Roman Catholic church in the village commenced in 1874 under Capuchin father Ernesto. The current Gothic Revival church was built in 1922–1923.

== Notable people ==
Notable natives include weightlifter and 2004 Olympic gold medalist Milen Dobrev (b. 1980) and footballer Atanas Bornosuzov (b. 1979).

== Gallery ==
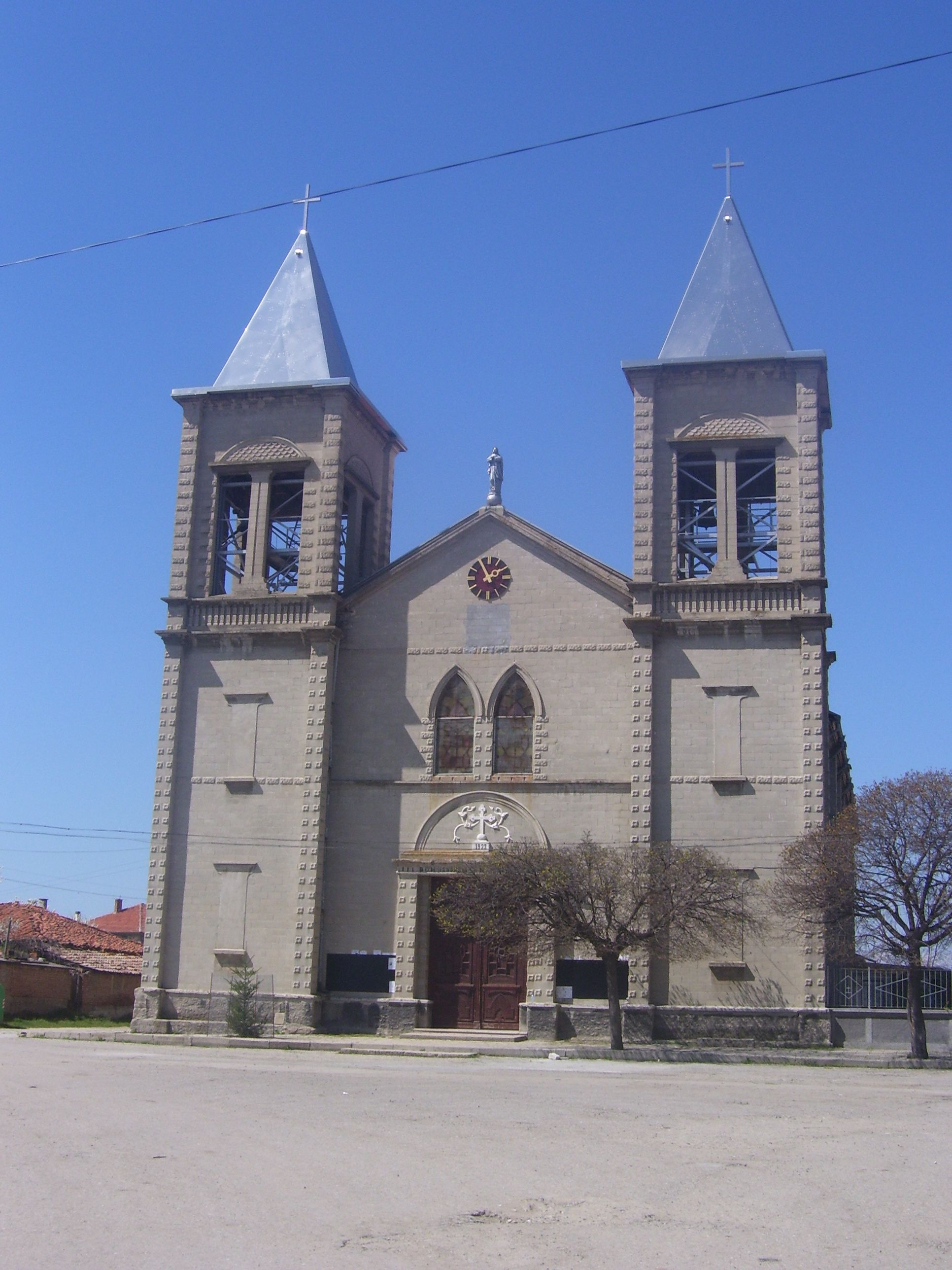
Church

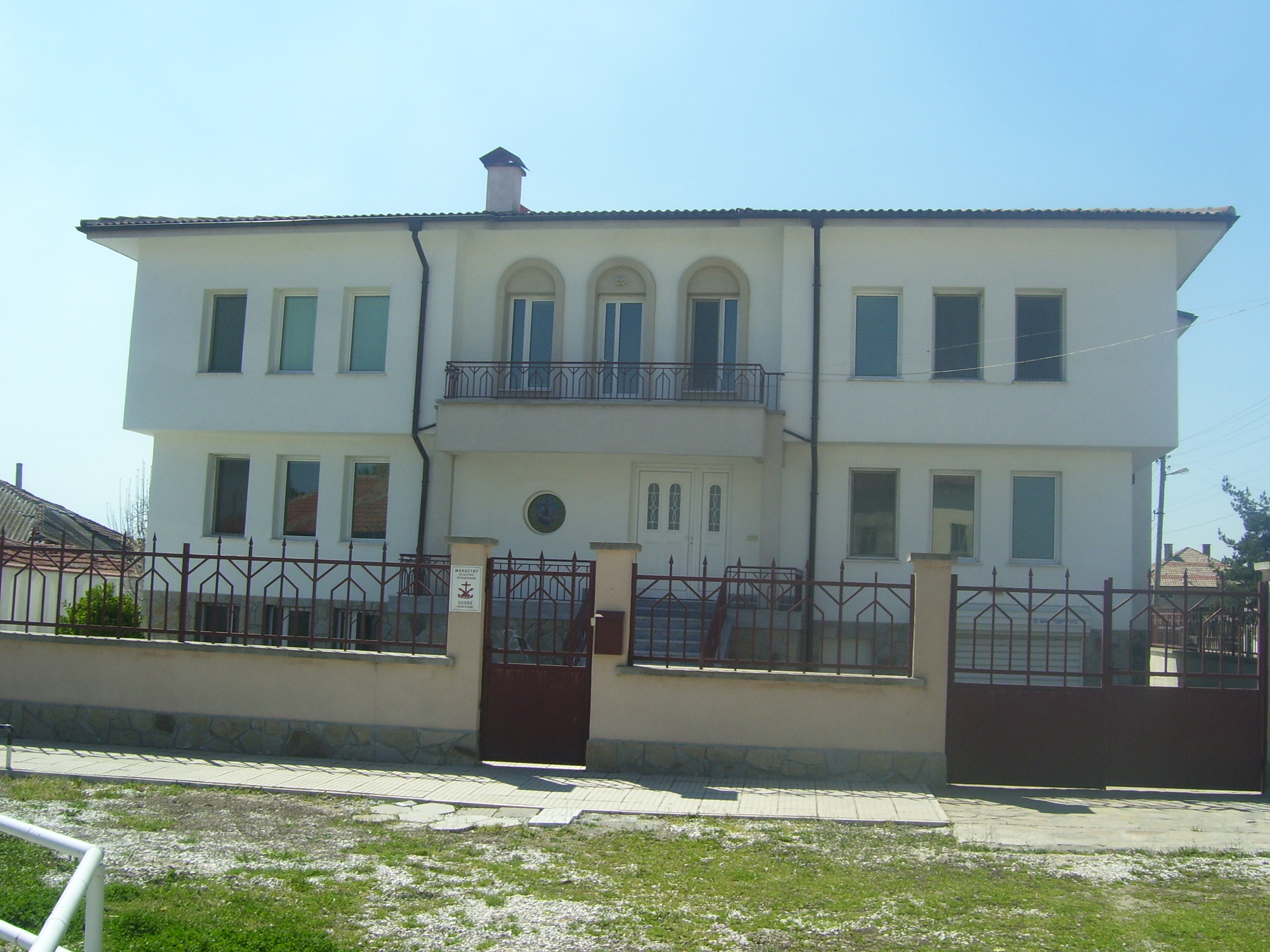
Roman Catholic monastery

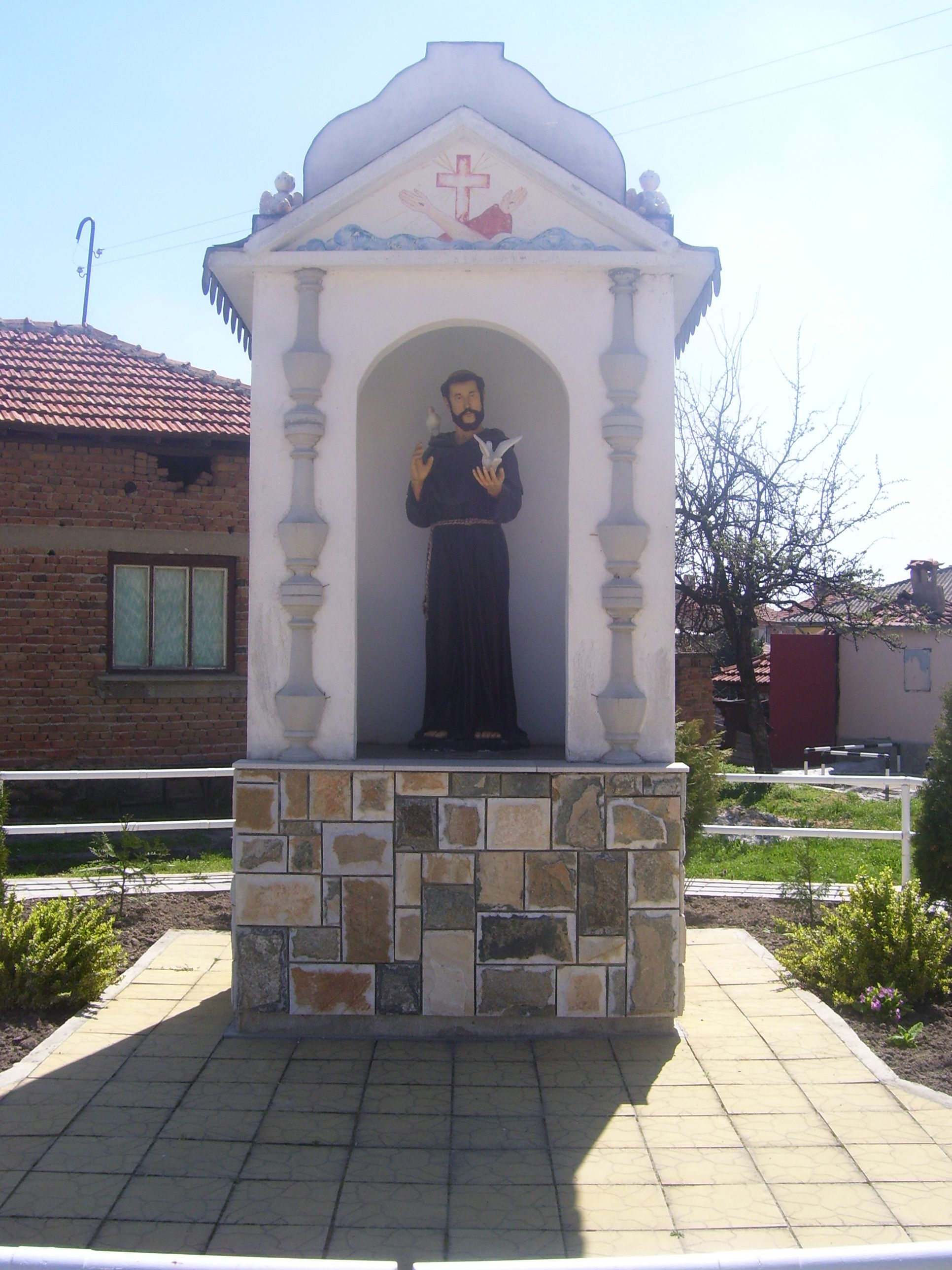
Statue
