= Hamza Bali =

Bosnian Sufi leader (died 1573)

Hamza Bali was a Bosnian Sufi leader, who was executed in Istanbul in 1573 on charges of heresy. He was the founder of the Hamzevis, a heterodox Sufi order. According to Noel Malcolm, "Little is known about his teachings, though they apparently went far beyond the Bektashi in admitting elements of Christian theology". However, Hamid Algar questions claims that Hamza Bali's teaching involved syncretism with Christianity, on the grounds that there is no mention of that allegation in the Ottoman sources, the sole contemporary source for it being the diary of Stephan Gerlach, who in 1573 was present in Istanbul as an assistant to David Ungnad von Sonnegg, the Ambassador of the Holy Roman Empire; Algar suggests that Gerlach may have confused Hamza Bali with Molla Kâbız, who was executed by the Ottomans in 1527 for teaching syncretic Christian doctrines. Algar furthermore alleges that Bosnian nationalist historians (such as Smail Balić) have used Hamza Bali's purported Christian syncretism to position him as a figure unifying Bosnia's Islamic and pre-Islamic histories.
