= Kaloyanovo, Plovdiv Province =

Village in Plovdiv Province, Bulgaria

Coordinates: 42°21′00″N 24°44′00″E

Kaloyanovo (Bulgarian: Калояново) is a village in southern Bulgaria, and the administrative center of the Kaloyanovo Municipality in the Plovdiv Province. As of 2009 it has 2,672 inhabitants. The village is situated in an agricultural region and is close to the spa resort Hisarya.

The population is entirely ethnic Bulgarian. However, the locals follow the two major mainstreams of Christianity: there are 1,600 Bulgarian Orthodox and 1,100 Roman Catholic Christians. Kaloyanovo has both a Bulgarian Orthodox, built in 1845, and a Gothic Revival Roman Catholic church. Some of the Orthodox population descends from Bulgarian refugees from Greek Macedonia and more precisely Gorno Frashtani (today Oreini, Serres).

== Geography ==
Kaloyanovo is located 24 kilometers away from Plovdiv. It is also 16 kilometers away from speedway Trakia, which is the main road artery connecting Western Europe with The Middle East.

Kaloyanovo is the site of Drakon Race Track, Bulgaria's first automobile race track.

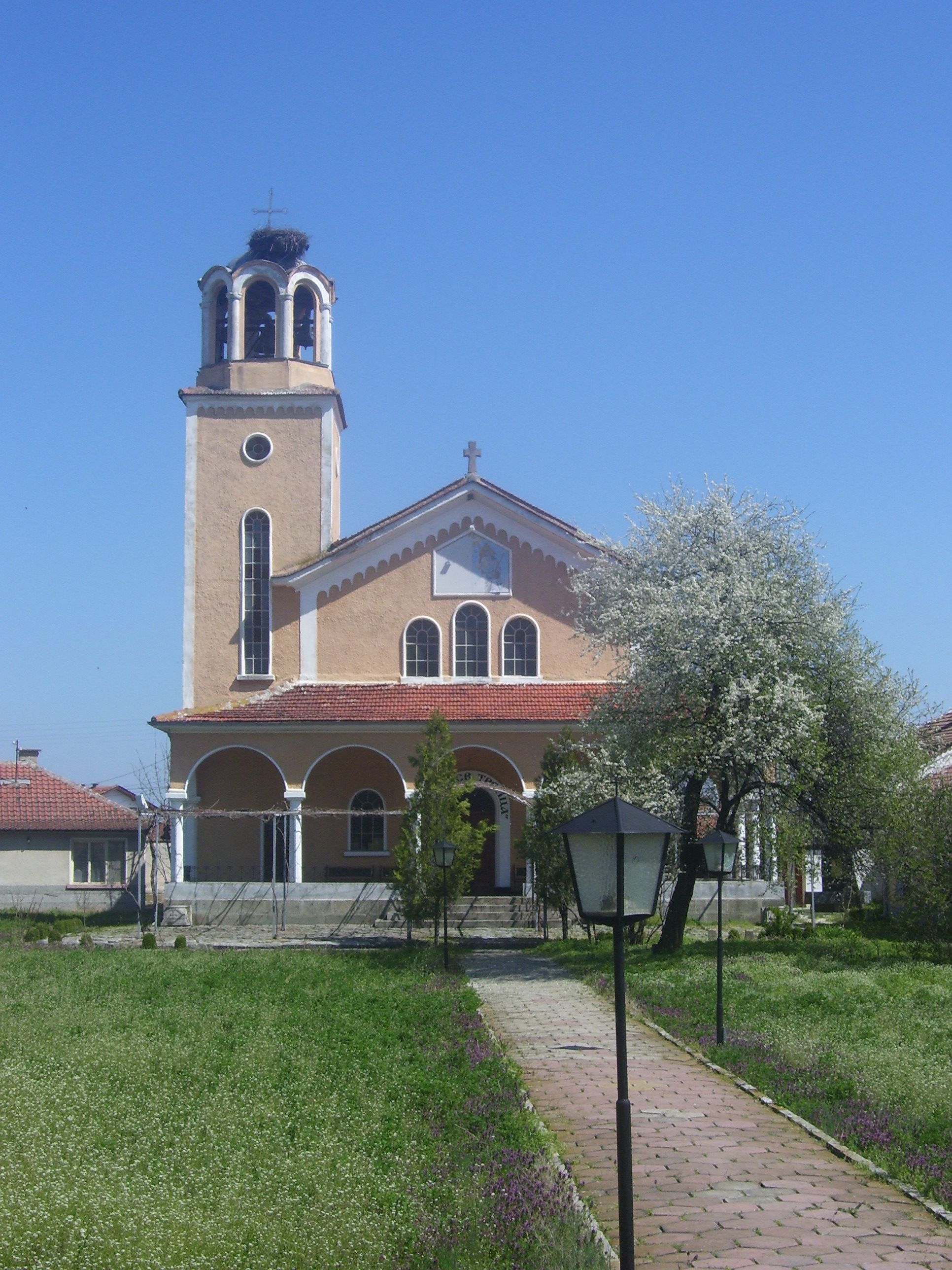
Bulgarian Orthodox church

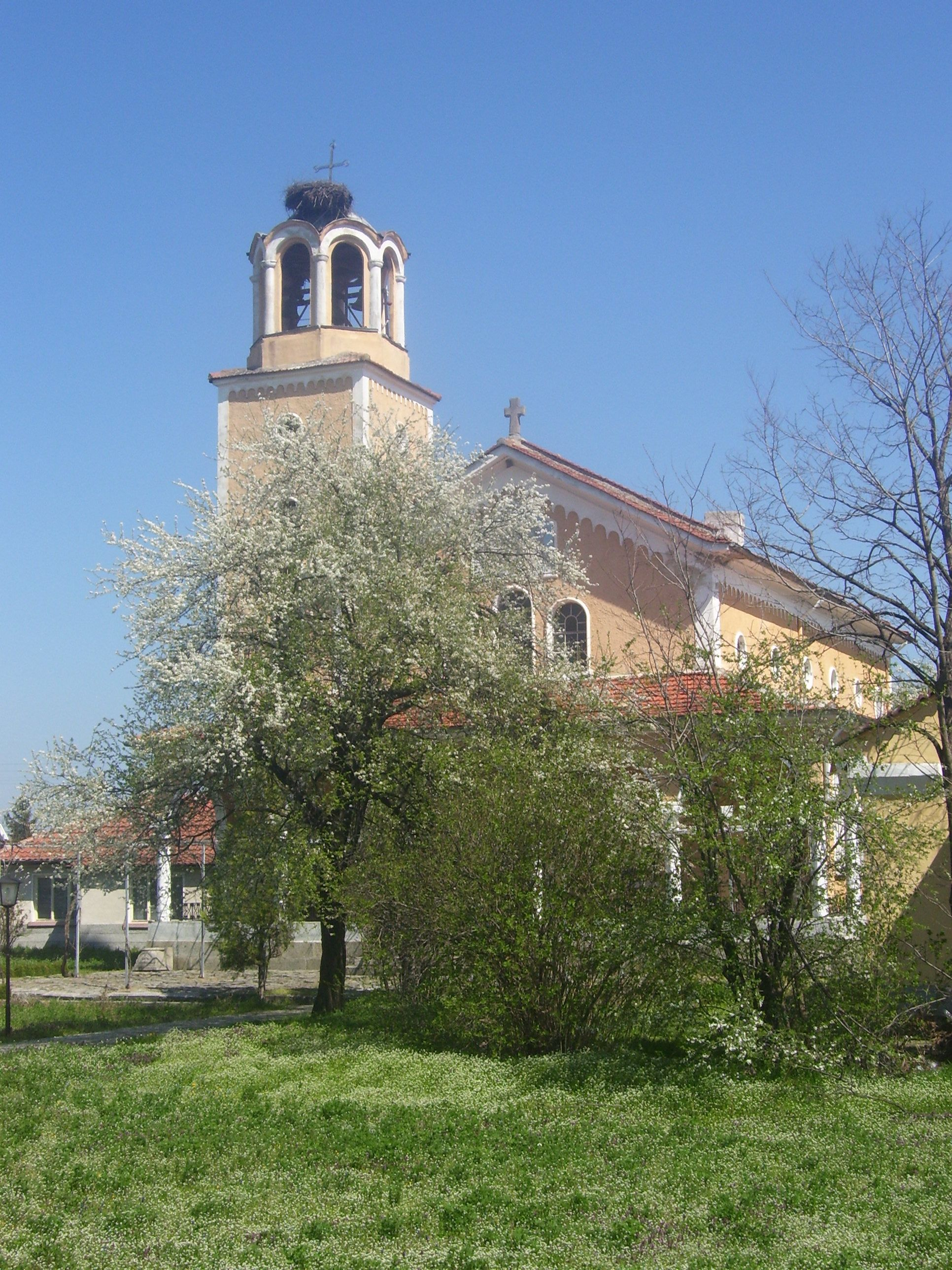
Bulgarian Orthodox church

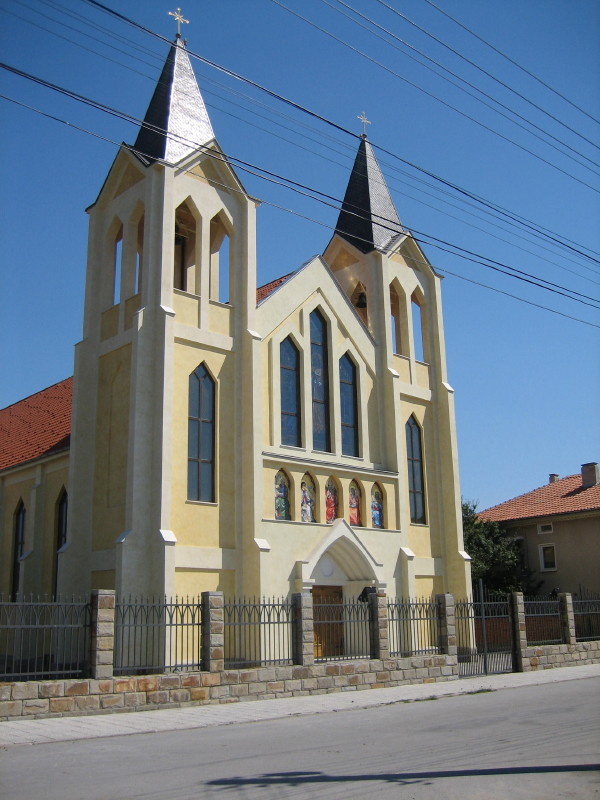
Roman Catholic church

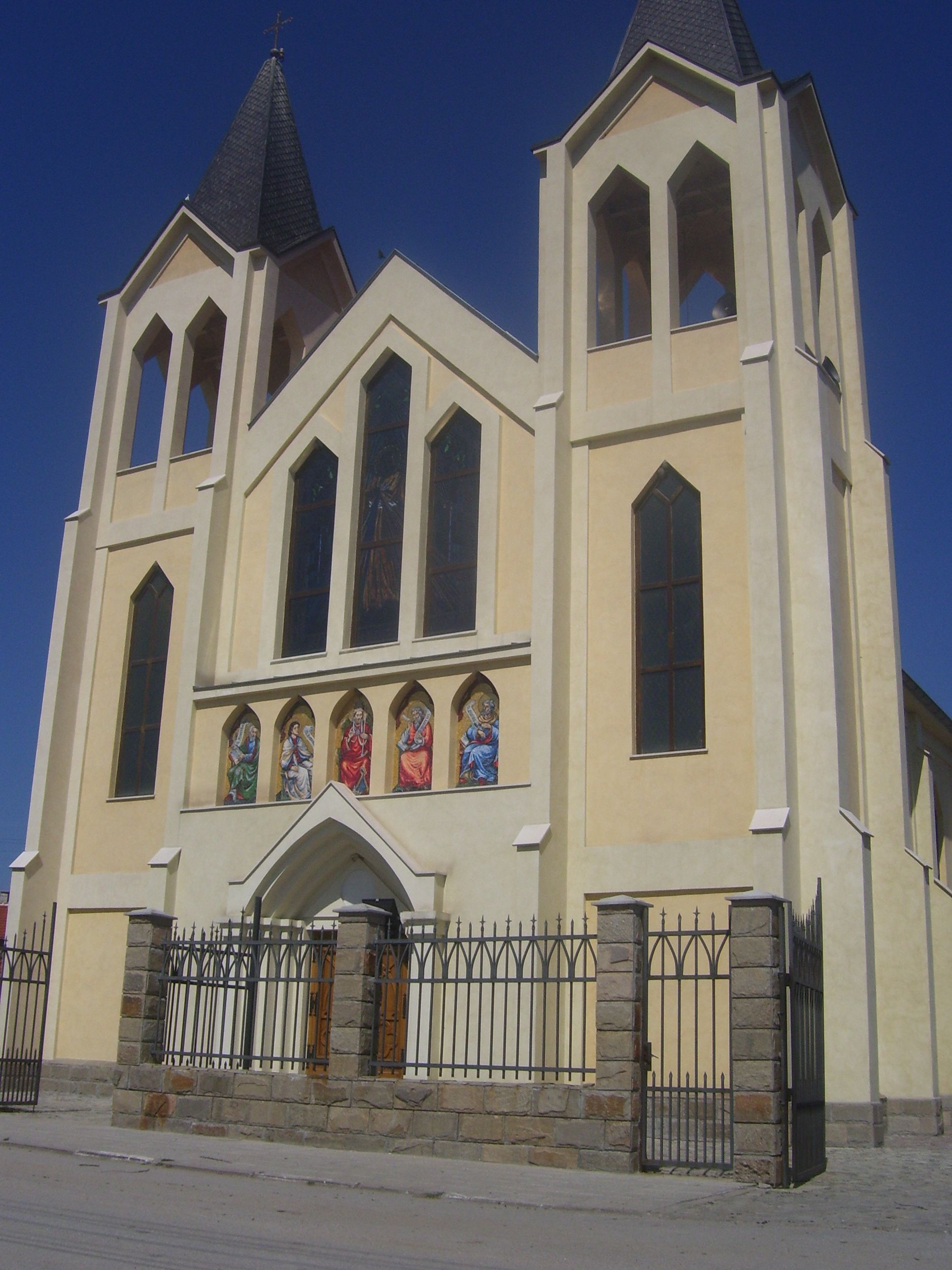
Roman Catholic church

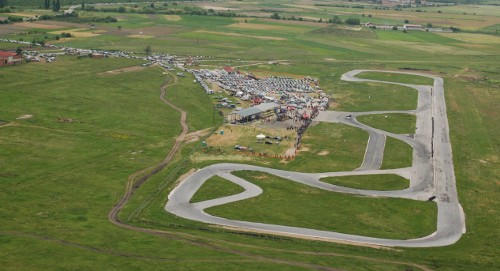
Drakon Race Track
