= Bursa Çimento =

Cement factory located in Bursa

- Traded as: BIST: BUCIM
- Industry: Cement
- Founded: July 14, 1966; 59 years ago
- Headquarters: Bursa
- Key people: İsmail Tarman
- Net income: 75,4 Million Turkish liras (2020)
- Owner: İsmail Tarman: %32,71; Tarman Turizm: %12,92; Bemsa: %9,59; Mehmet Celal Gökçen: %6,23; Public: %38,55
- Website: bursacimento.com.tr

Bursa Çimento is the sole cement factory in Bursa, established on 14 July 1966 as a joint stock company in Kestel, with a capital of 70,543,872 TL. The foundation of the factory was laid in 1967 with the participation of Prime Minister Süleyman Demirel and the board of directors elected in 1966. The company maintains its corporate identity with 100% publicly traded capital. The factory has an additional production facility located in Kütahya.

== Board of directors involved in the establishment ==
The first board of directors elected in 1966
Name	Title
Hayri Terzioğlu	Chairman
Ziya Uğur	Deputy chairman
Abdurrahman Şenipek	Board member
Abdi Biçen	Board member
Kamil Tolon	Board member
Zeki Yücel	Board member
Reşat Atıl	Board member
Hüseyin Sungur	Board member
Fuat Özyol	Board member
Kemal Türkün	Board member
Ali Fidanlar	Board member
