= Kamil Tolon =

Turkish industrialist (1912–1978)

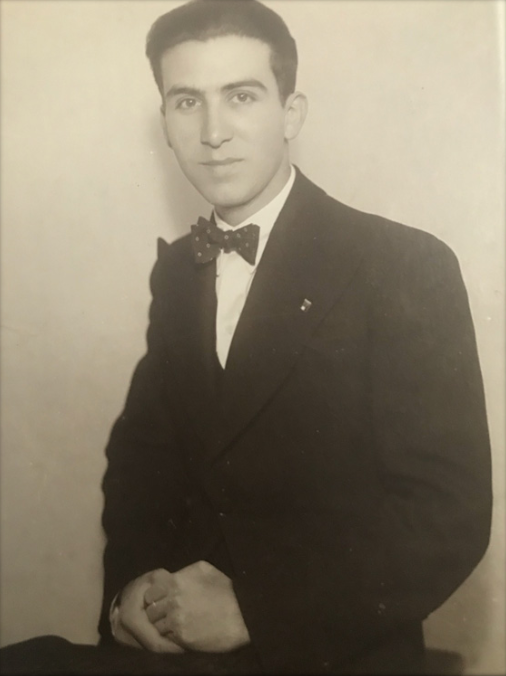
- Born: 29 February 1912; Istanbul, Ottoman Empire
- Died: 23 July 1978 (aged 66); Geneva, Switzerland
- Other name: Kamil Özdemir Tolonçok
- Education: Ankara University Faculty of Law
- Known for: Invention of the first washing machine and electric engine in Turkey
- Political party: Justice
- Spouses: Müeyyet Bulut; Muzaffer Biliktü
- Children: 4
- Website: kamiltolon.com

Kamil Özdemir Tolon (29 February 1912 – 23 July 1978) was a Turkish businessperson, industrialist and inventor, known for the first manufacture of an electric engine in Turkey. Tolon was born in 1912 in Istanbul. He had his secondary and university education in Ankara. He wanted to become an engineer, but went to the Ankara University Faculty of Law instead due to the lack of engineering schools. He graduated in 1935, and started working as a Posta ve Telgraf Teşkilatı (lit. transl. Post and Telegraph Agency: PTT) inspector after university, but left the job not long after.

After moving to Bursa, he founded Tolon Makina in 1937, where he started to produce several machines. In 1944, he was drafted into the army, where he continued working on new inventions to be used for the army. After returning from the army, Tolon started producing combine harvesters, water pumps, washing machines and dishwashers. While initially using imported engines, he was later compelled to build his own engine by Turkish Prime Minister Adnan Menderes and made the first indigenously manufactured electric engine in Turkey.

Tolon moved to a new factory after a fire damaged his workshop in 1958. The factory started production in 1960 and resulted in an increase of sales. He was a founding member of the Justice Party and became a chairman at the Bursa Chamber of Commerce and Industry. Regarded as one of the most important figures in Turkish industrialism, Kamil Tolon died in 1978 in Geneva, Switzerland, from an embolism.

== Early and personal life ==
Kamil Tolon was born on 29 February 1912 (Note: Some sources use 1913 as the date, but 1912—a leap year—is generally accepted as his true birth date due to his birthday being on 29 February.) in the Beylerbeyi neighborhood of Istanbul. He was the second child of six children in the Saatçioğulları family. He was known as Muhittin oğlu Kamil (lit. transl. Muhittin's son Kamil) as surnames in Turkey were not mandatory at the time. His primary education took place in several different provinces of Turkey. Tolon attended high school at a boarding school in Ankara, and graduated in September 1935. During his time in high school, he was interested in engineering: he designed a music box while still being a student. However, due to the lack of engineering faculties at the time, Tolon instead had to attend the Ankara University Faculty of Law for higher education. At the faculty of law, he met several future politicians, including Adnan Menderes, the 9th prime minister of Turkey. Tolon graduated from university on 4 July 1935.

In 1935, with the new Surname Law requiring every Turkish citizen to assume a hereditary surname, he took the surname Tolonçok, meaning "very talented". He changed it to simply Tolon later in 1944. In 1936, Tolon married Müeyyet Bulut, with whom he had two daughters, Abatun (1936–2022) and Barkın (1942–2023). Tolon and Bulut divorced in 1942. The older daughter stayed with Tolon, while his younger daughter stayed with her mother. In February 1943, Tolon married his second wife, Muzaffer Biliktü. They also had two children: a son, Dara (born 1944), and a daughter, Cana (born 1949). Despite the divorce, Tolon and Müeyyet Bulut still held family reunions, with Cana referring to Bulut as her aunt.

== Career ==
=== PTT inspector and return to engineering ===
After graduating from university, Tolon started to work at Posta ve Telgraf Teşkilatı (lit. transl. Post and Telegraph Agency: PTT) as an inspector. He was sent to Anatolia for his first inspection, though he resigned almost immediately after an encounter with an extremely poor villager. He went to an engineering school in France for a brief period, before opening a shop in Bursa in 1937, which he named Tolon Makina. In 1942, Tolon met Fahri Batıca. The two started a workshop together on Cumhuriyet Street, where they manufactured wheel hubs for cars and Jacquard machines. They split up two years later in 1944 after Batıca said that engineering was a thing for Tolon and not for him. Following this, Tolon started to work at the workshop with his wife.

In 1944, Tolon was drafted into the army and was sent to Nara, Çanakkale. He continued his work during the army; most importantly producing machines to cut mines, which were used to neutralize naval mines in the Dardanelles left over from World War I. He spent 5 months cleaning mines and assisting soldiers in the use of his machine. Following regular electricity outages in his military squad, he made an electricity generator, as well as a portable washing machine for soldiers who were traveling. The washing machine was assembled in the back of a truck and was used in the army for several years.

=== Return from military and first electric engine ===
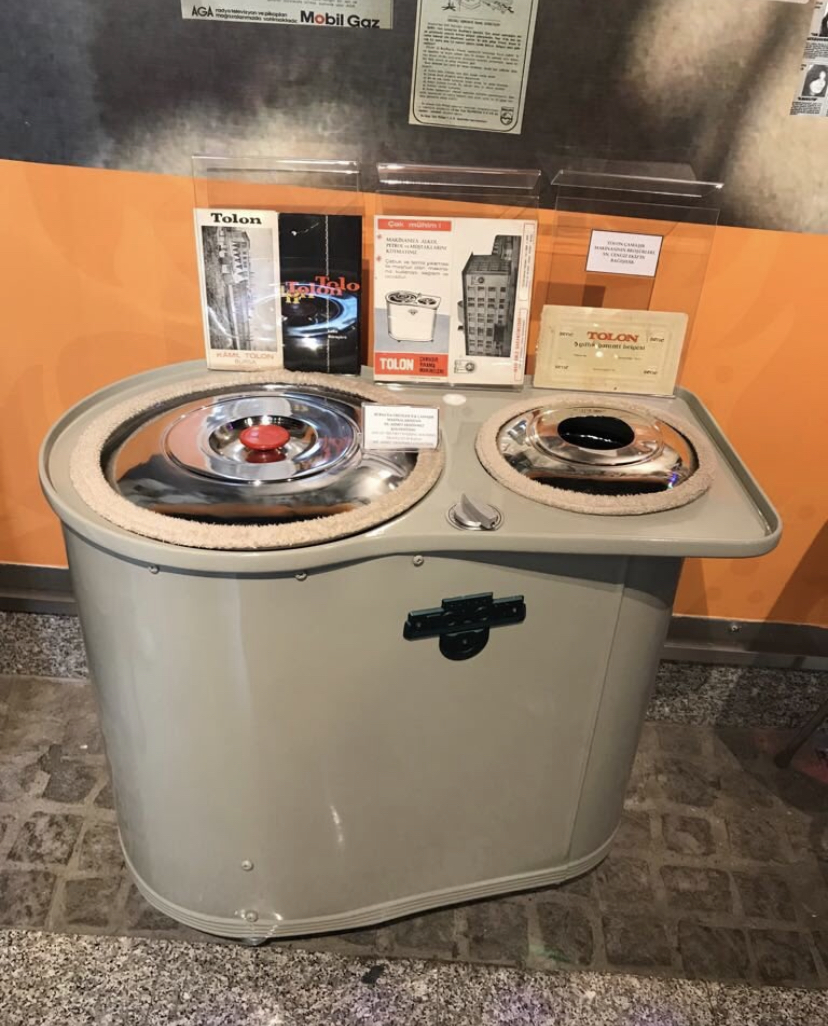
A washing machine of Tolon from the 1950s

Tolon returned to Bursa from the military in 1945. That same year he made power looms, sawing machines and drills in his workshop. In 1948 and 1949, Tolon manufactured a combine harvester and water pumps for farmers. The government decided to buy the harvester, but needed to test the machine. A European manufacturer also joined the testing, but secretly installed iron bars on the farm land where the test took place, causing the harvester to break.

Tolon also manufactured washing machines and dishwashers in his workshop, which were the first manufactured in the country. He received the patents for these products in 1953. Washing machines at the time were only owned by the wealthy, as the need to import them made them expensive. Tolon's machine allowed many more families to acquire one. The copper wires needed for the machines were processed in his own workshop and everything apart from the engines were built by Tolon. The engines were imported from abroad and had an import quota. Tolon had trouble selling the dishwasher, as locals at the time thought that washing dishes by hand was cleaner: as a result, he stopped production.

While visiting Bursa, then–prime minister Adnan Menderes told Tolon that he was not allowed to import engines anymore, and forced him to manufacture his own engine. This led to the manufacture of the first electric engine of Turkey, which were used for Tolon's machines. The first engine had a power of 0.35 kilowatts (0.47 hp). The improved version that went into mass production had a power of 30–40 kilowatts (40–54 hp). The machines were considered to be of high quality, with Hürriyet reporting that "these domestic washing machines are the same as, or even more durable and practical than European goods." (Note: Quoted from Hürriyet's issue of 1 September 1955: "Bu yerli malı çamaşır makineleri Avrupa malından farksız, hatta daha sağlam ve kullanışlıdır.")

=== Relocation due to fire ===
In December 1957, Tolon bought a 14-acre (5.7 ha) field near the village of Soğukpınarlı. On 24 August 1958, a major fire destroyed 1130 shops at the bazaar (kapalıçarşı) and Cumhuriyet Street in Bursa, including Tolon's shop. Taking advantage of the chaos, several of his machines were looted by people. Despite the fire completely burning down his workshop, he temporarily continued his work in tents of the Turkish Red Crescent. Tolon was one of the first to resume production among those manufacturers who were affected by the fire. Following the fire, Tolon started to plan a factory at the field near Soğukpınarlı. Construction began in 1959, with Tolon himself making the drawings and being the architect. Production of machines at the factory started in 1960. Sales increased with the new factory, with Tolon opening stores in 64 of the 67 provinces in Turkey.

== Later ventures ==
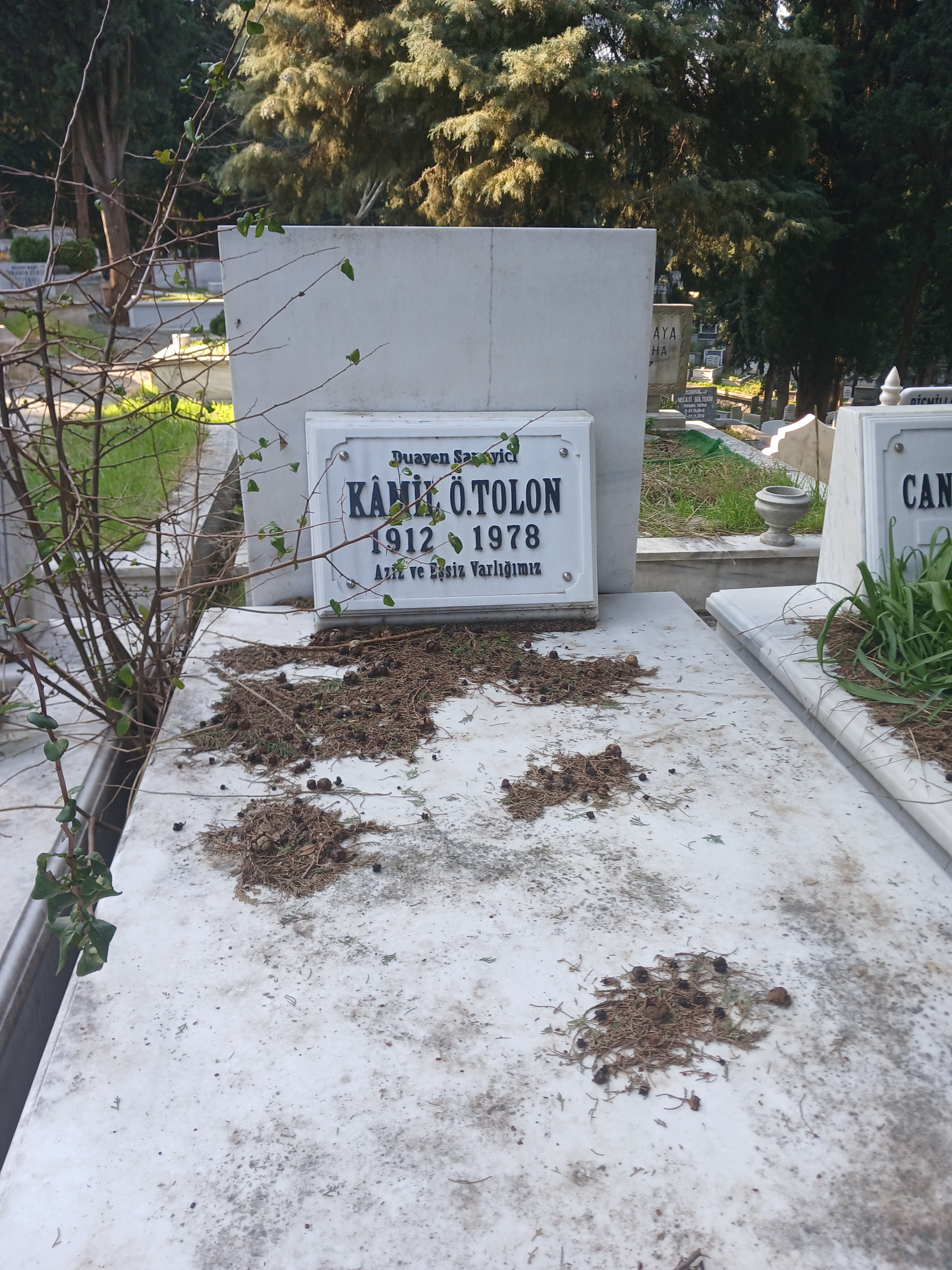
Grave of Tolon in the Emir Sultan Cemetery, Bursa

Kamil Tolon was the chairman of the executive board of Bursa Chamber of Commerce and Industry from 1963 to 1965 and played a vital role in the founding of the first organized industrial zone of Turkey. He was one of the founding members of the Justice Party. He considered becoming a member of the Grand National Assembly of Turkey, but was not able to due to an uneasy atmosphere within the party. Tolon was one of the 28 people allowed to vote to select the chairman of the party in 1964.

He died on 23 July 1978 in Geneva, Switzerland after suffering from an embolism following a heart surgery at the age of 66. He is buried in the Emir Sultan Cemetery, Bursa, next to the Emir Sultan Mosque. His son Dara moved the factory to İzmir after his death. The old factory in Bursa was demolished in 2017 as part of an urban renewal project.

== Legacy ==
Kamil Tolon is thought to be an important figure in Turkish industrialism. Turkish president and Justice Party leader Süleyman Demirel considered Kamil Tolon to be one of the people who initiated industrialization movements in Bursa and across the country. He added that Tolon had made "great contributions" for him to become the leader of the party. According to a 2004 article in the Turkish newspaper Sabah, when mothers were asked to name a company from their era, many first named Tolon Makina. The newspaper joked that "even Greeks were using the machines of Tolon." An arts and science school in Osmangazi, Bursa, is named after Tolon.
