= Istanbul Military Museum =

Museum in Istanbul

Coordinates: 41.0484°N 28.9883°E

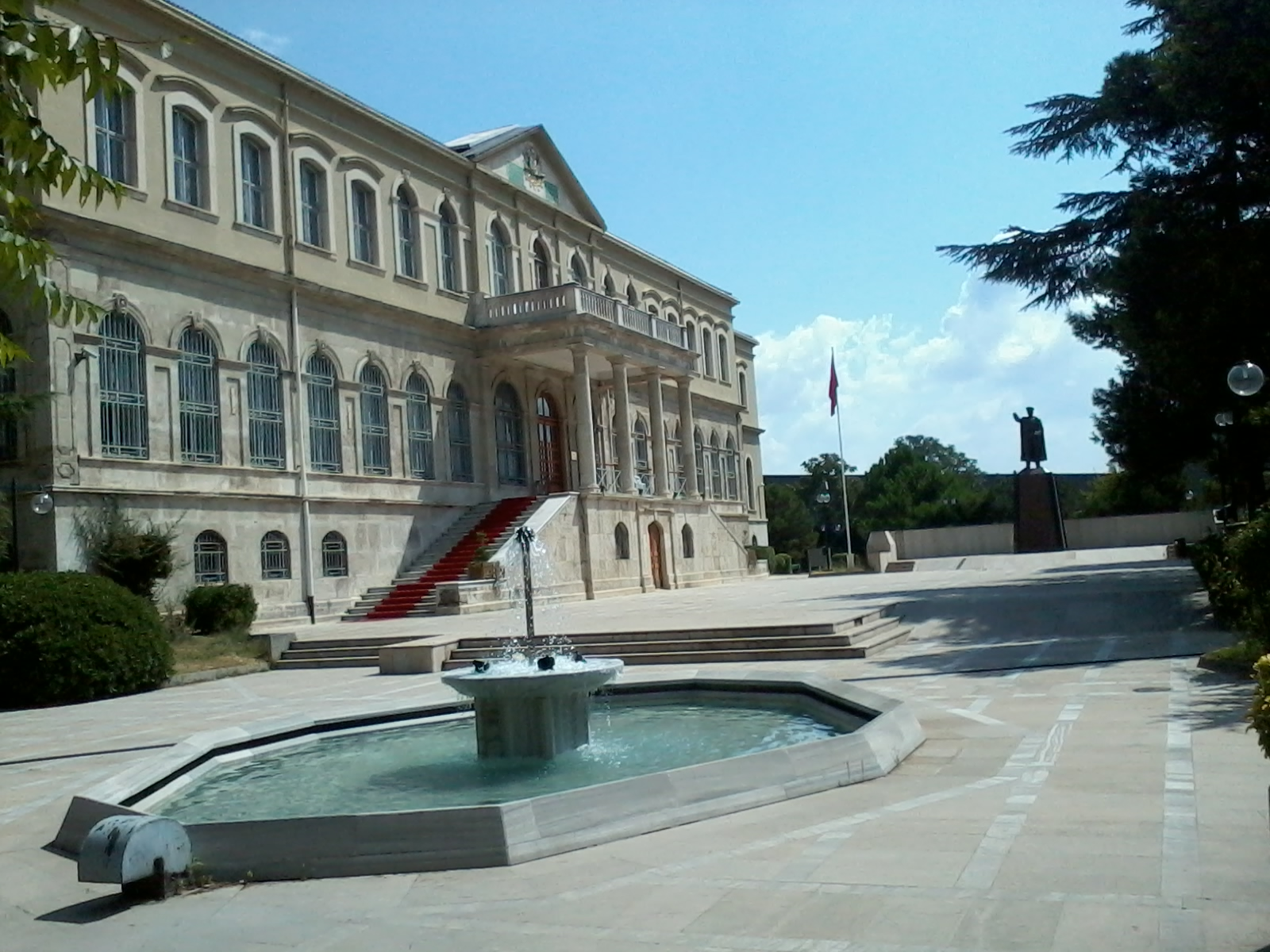
Main building of Military Museum.

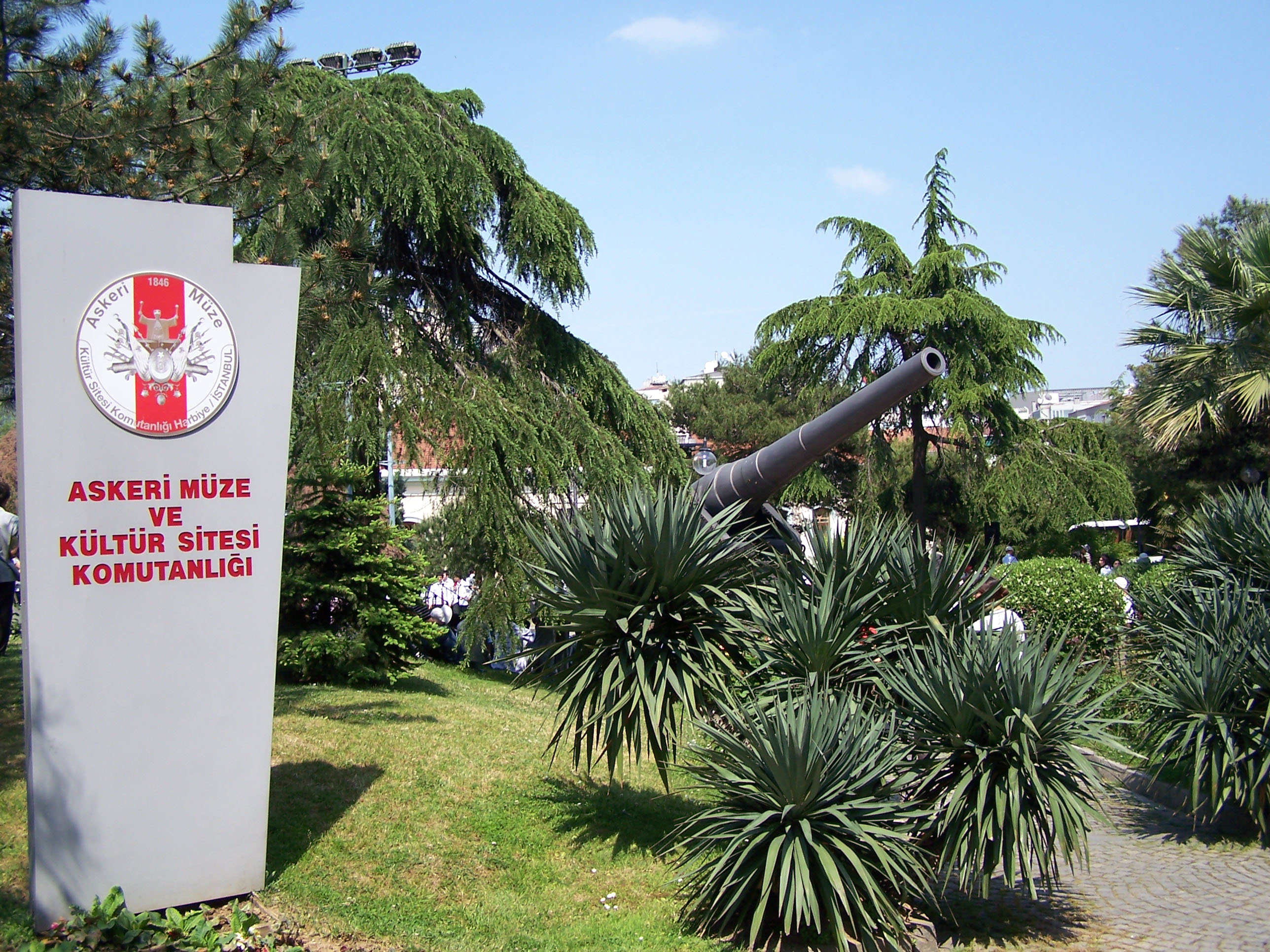
Istanbul Military Museum.

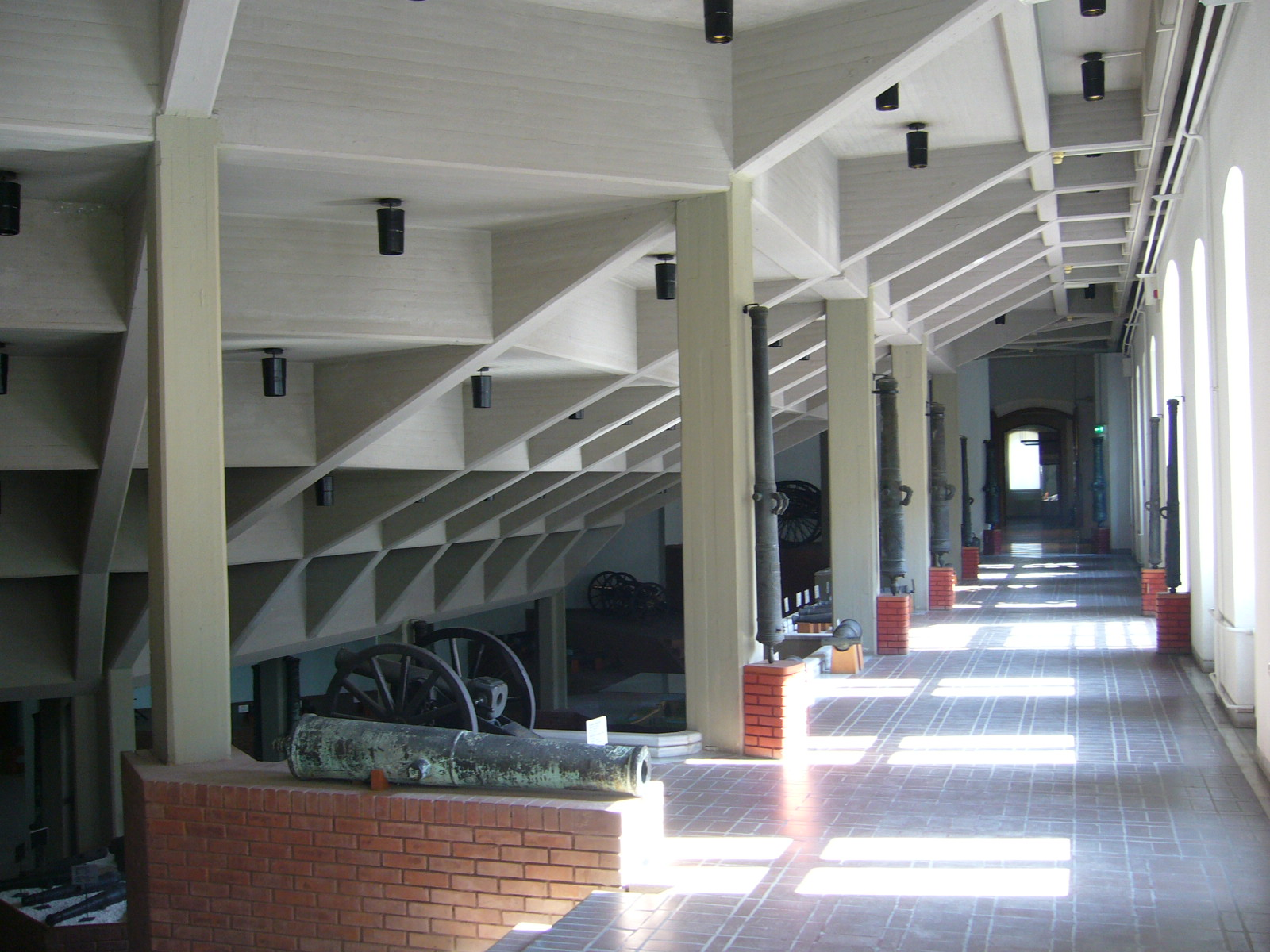
A display of cannon.

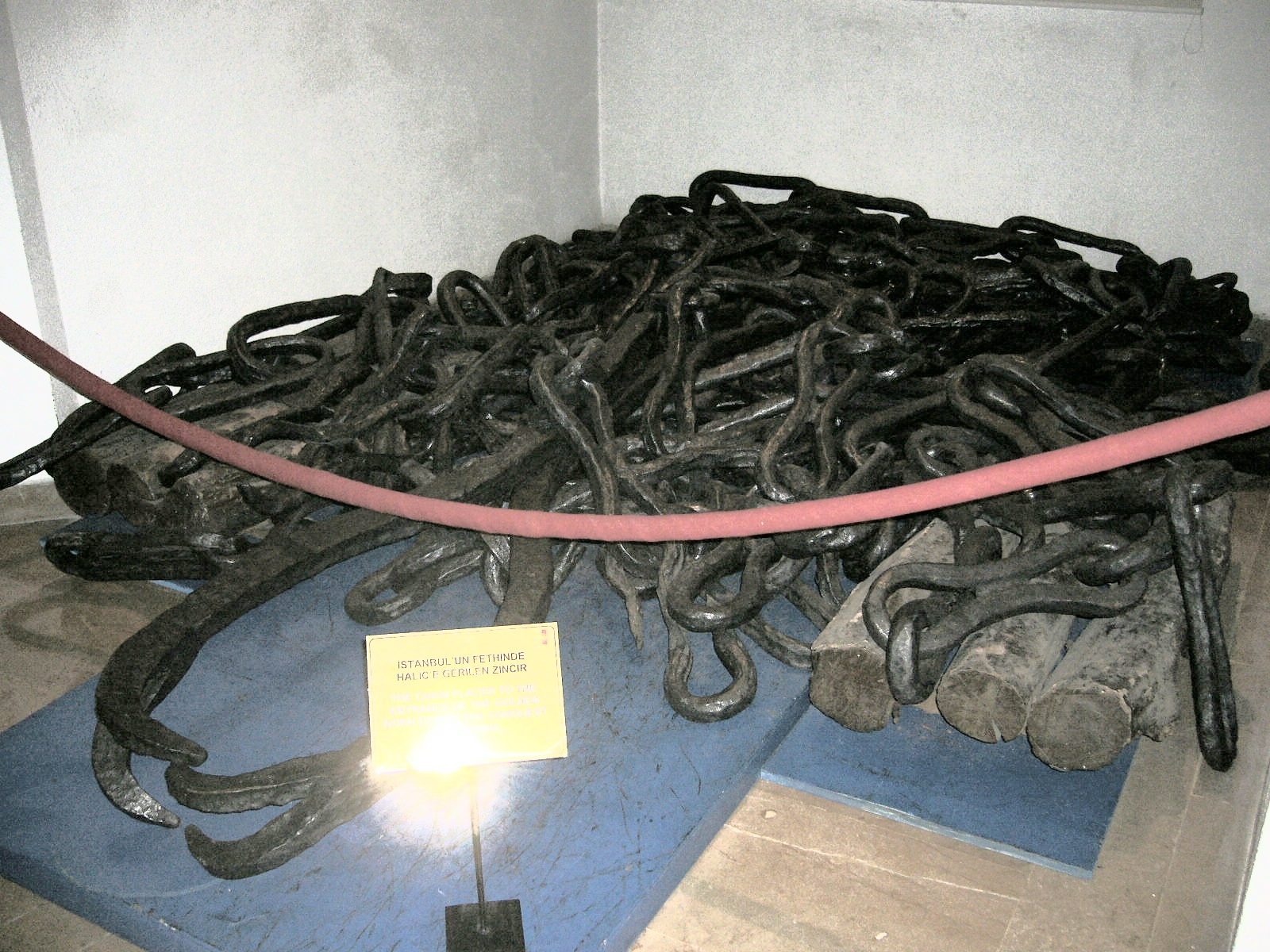
The chain, which the Byzantines stretched across the mouth of the Golden Horn to keep out the navy of Mehmed II in 1453 during the siege of Constantinople.

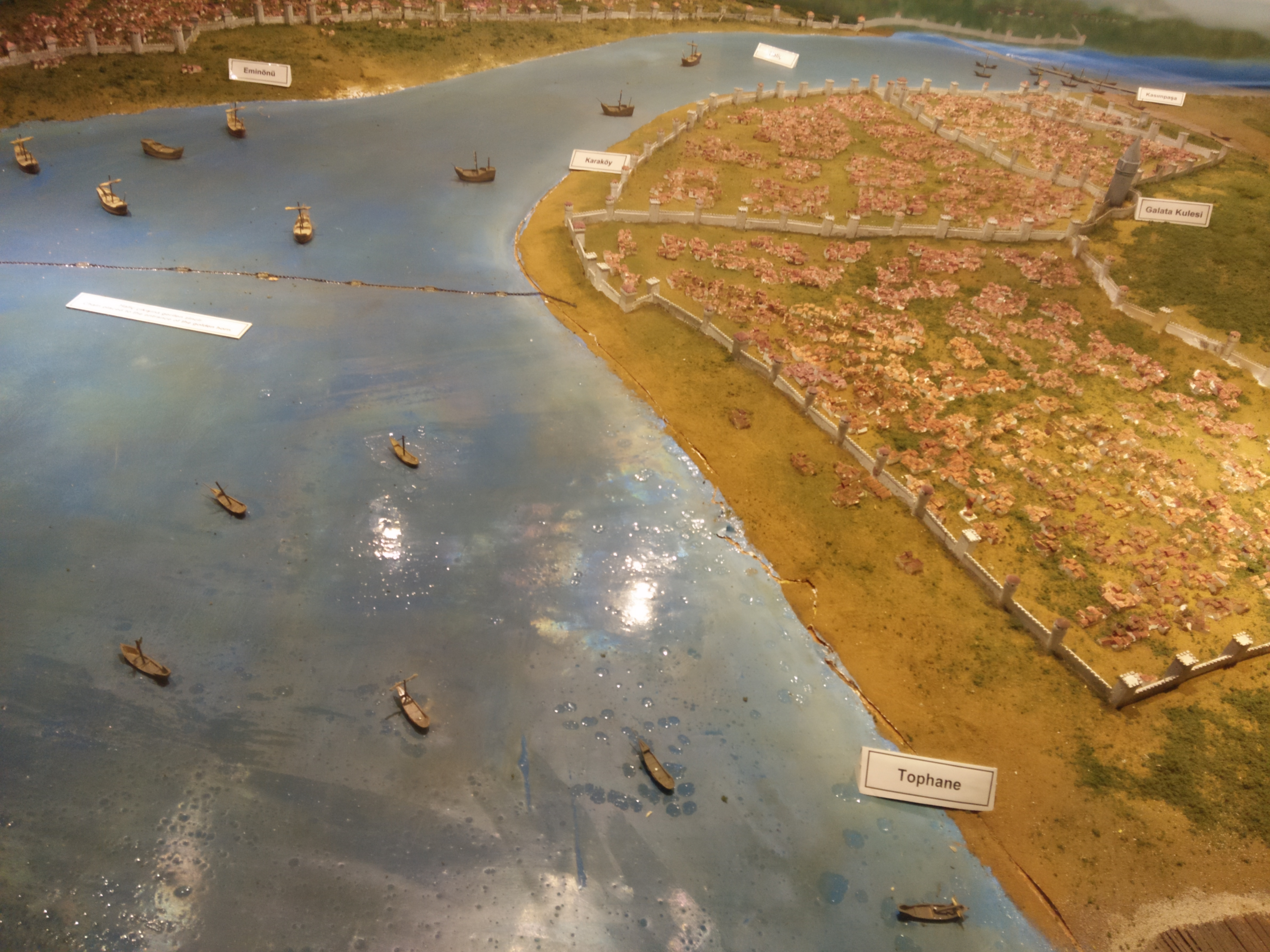
Model of the mouth where the chain was suspended. Galata and Galata Tower to the right.

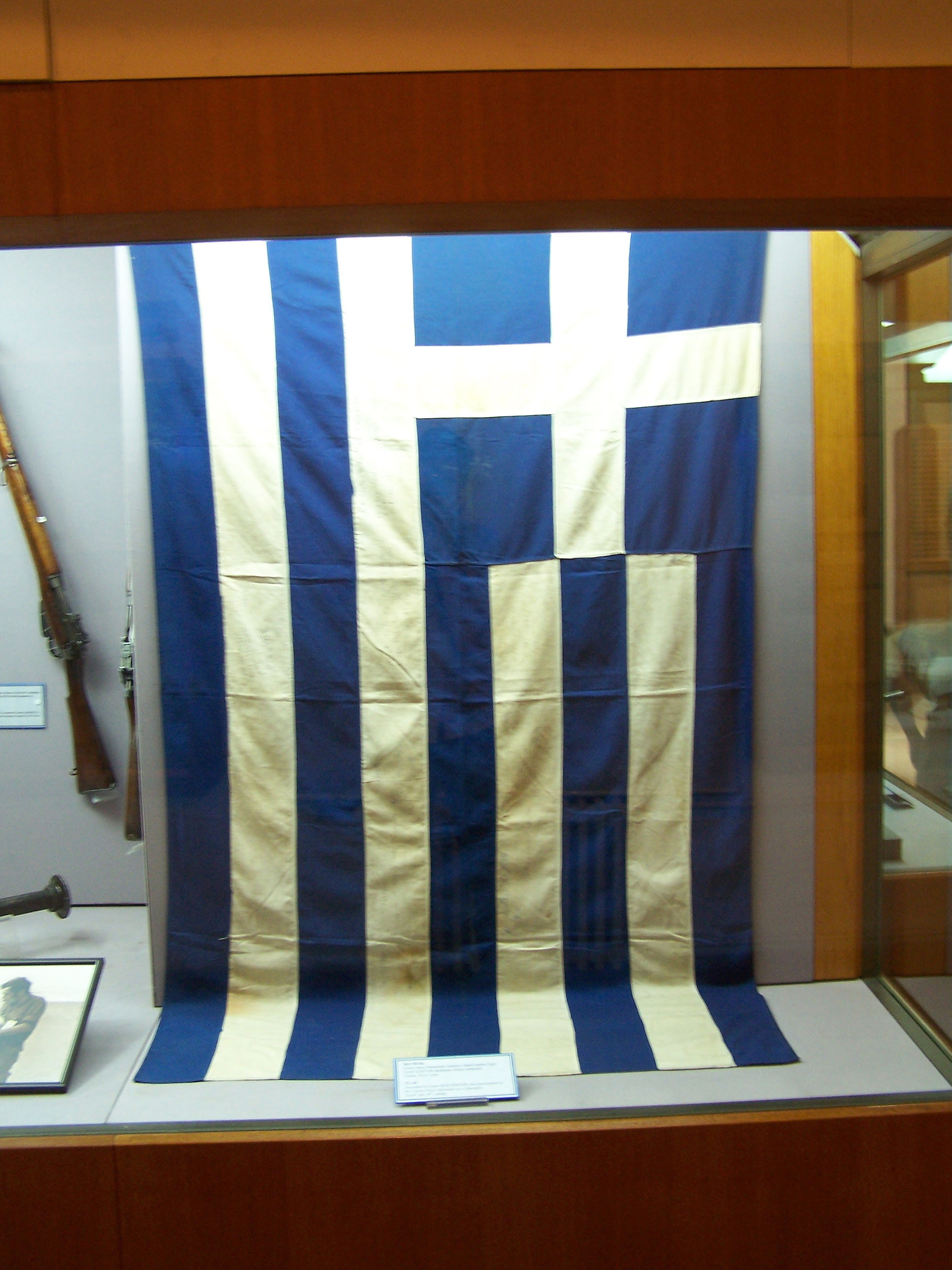
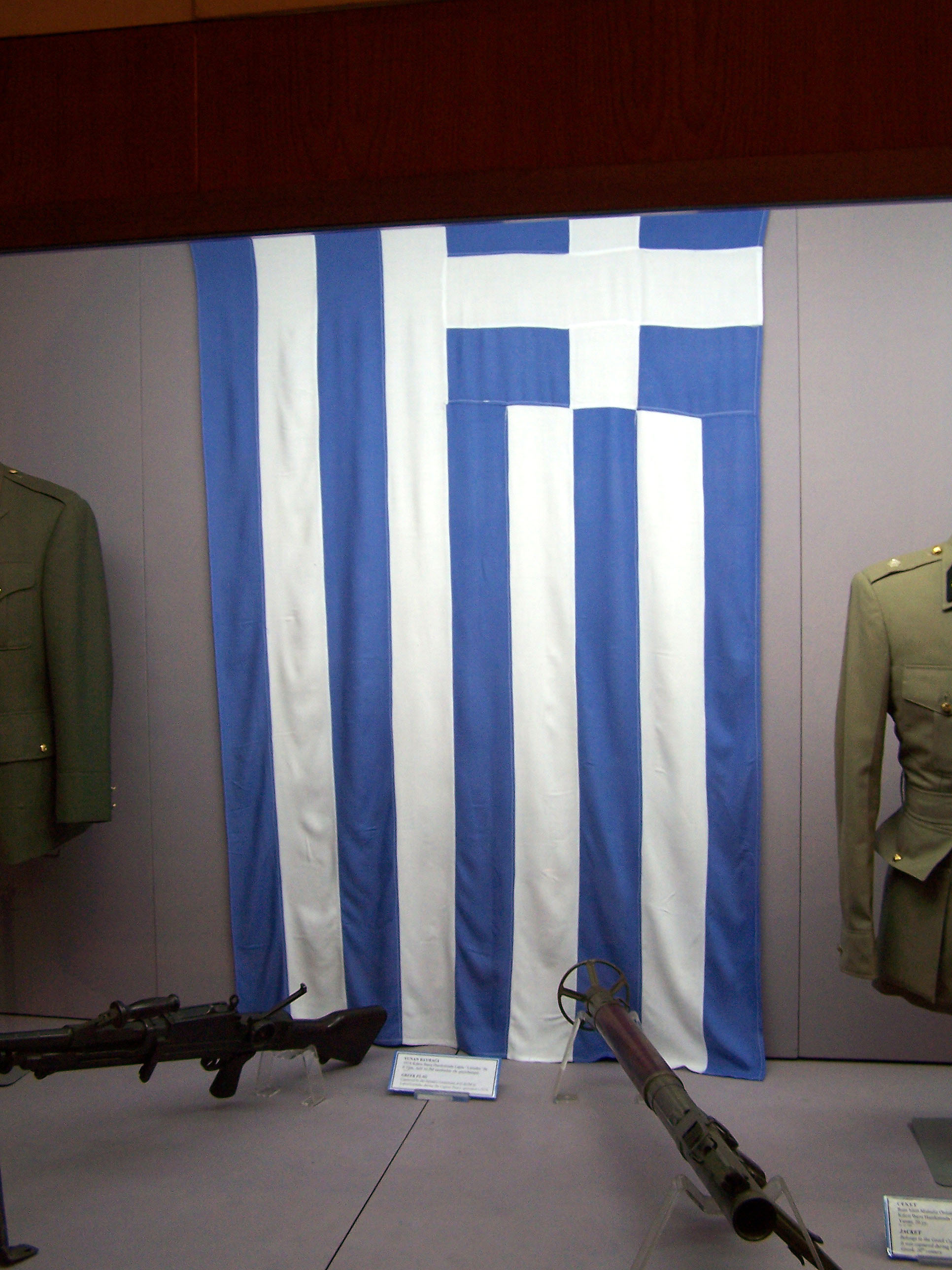
Greek flag captured during the Cyprus Peace Operation (according to the Turkish side, or Turkish invasion of Cyprus as it is known internationally)

The Istanbul Military Museum (Turkish: Askerî Müze) is a museum of military history located in Şişli, Istanbul. The museum is focused on Turkic history, and exhibits a large collection of Turkish military equipment from the 13th century to the modern day. The museum was founded in its modern form in 1959 by the Turkish Armed Forces, which continue to operate it.

The museum has been noted for propagandistic displays and omission of non-Turkish perspectives. It adopts a pro-Turkish stance on the Turkish invasion of Cyprus and has a hall dedicated to denying the Armenian genocide.

== History ==
The origins of the Istanbul Military Museum (Askerî Müze) date back to the late Ottoman Empire, when the first military collections were exhibited in Hagia Irene (Saint Irene Church) in Istanbul—one of the city’s oldest surviving Byzantine churches. This initial display formed the foundation of the Ottoman Empire’s early military museum.

In 1950, the collection was relocated to the First Army Headquarters building on Cumhuriyet Caddesi in the Harbiye district, near Taksim Square. The name Harbiye derives from the Ottoman Turkish word related to the Arabic ḥarb (“warfare”) and reflects the area’s historical role as the site of the Ottoman Military College, often compared to West Point or Sandhurst. The district continues to host important Turkish military institutions today.

A major reorganization of the museum was undertaken in 1957 under General Ahmet Hulki Saral, modernizing the exhibits and expanding the scope of the collection. Following further restoration and redesign, the museum was renovated and reopened in 1993 with a contemporary exhibition concept that remains in use today

== Collection ==
A fine collection of historical weapons, uniforms and tools of various periods of the army are on display. The highlights are the magnificent campaign tents and standards. Outside the museum, interesting Ottoman cannons and mortars, a rail gun, aircraft, helicopters are on display. In 22 rooms about nine thousand pieces from the Ottoman era through World War I are exhibited, out of a total collection of fifty thousand objects. It holds striking historical treasures such as the chain that the Byzantines stretched across the mouth of the Golden Horn to keep out the Mehmed II's navy in 1453 during the siege of Constantinople. The east wing of the museum is used for temporary exhibitions, meetings and similar activities.

On the ground floor, the display of bows and arrows in the first room is followed by sections containing the weapons and other regalia of the cavalry, curved daggers and lancets carried by foot soldiers in the 15th century, 17th century copper head armor for horses and Ottoman shields carried by the janissaries, and sections devoted to Selim I, Mehmed II, the conquest of Istanbul, weaponry from the early Islamic, Iranian, Caucasian, European and Turkish periods. This floor also houses a unique collection of helmets and armor, as well as the sections allocated to firearms and great field tents used by sultans on their campaigns. On the upper floor there are rooms where objects from World War I, the Battle of Gallipoli, and the Turkish War of Independence, and uniforms from more recent times are displayed. There is also a room which is dedicated to Atatürk, who studied in the building when it was a military academy between 1899-1905.

== Cultural performances ==
The museum hosts daily performances by the Janissary Band (Mehter Takımı), a re-creation of the Ottoman imperial military band. The Mehter tradition is often described as the world’s oldest military band, with origins tracing back to the Ottoman and even earlier Turkic armies. While the continuity of the modern ensemble dates from later centuries, the Mehter style represents one of the earliest known examples of organized military music.

The Ottomans were among the first to integrate musicians into military campaigns and ceremonial life. After a town had been conquered, the Mehter accompanied the victorious commander in procession, performing slow-cadence marches in distinctive modal scales. The ensemble’s instrumentation—including kettledrums, oboes (zurna), and cymbals—was intended both to inspire troops and to impress upon newly conquered peoples the grandeur of the empire. Modern Mehter concerts, performed in traditional uniforms, are held most afternoons at the museum.

== Gallery ==
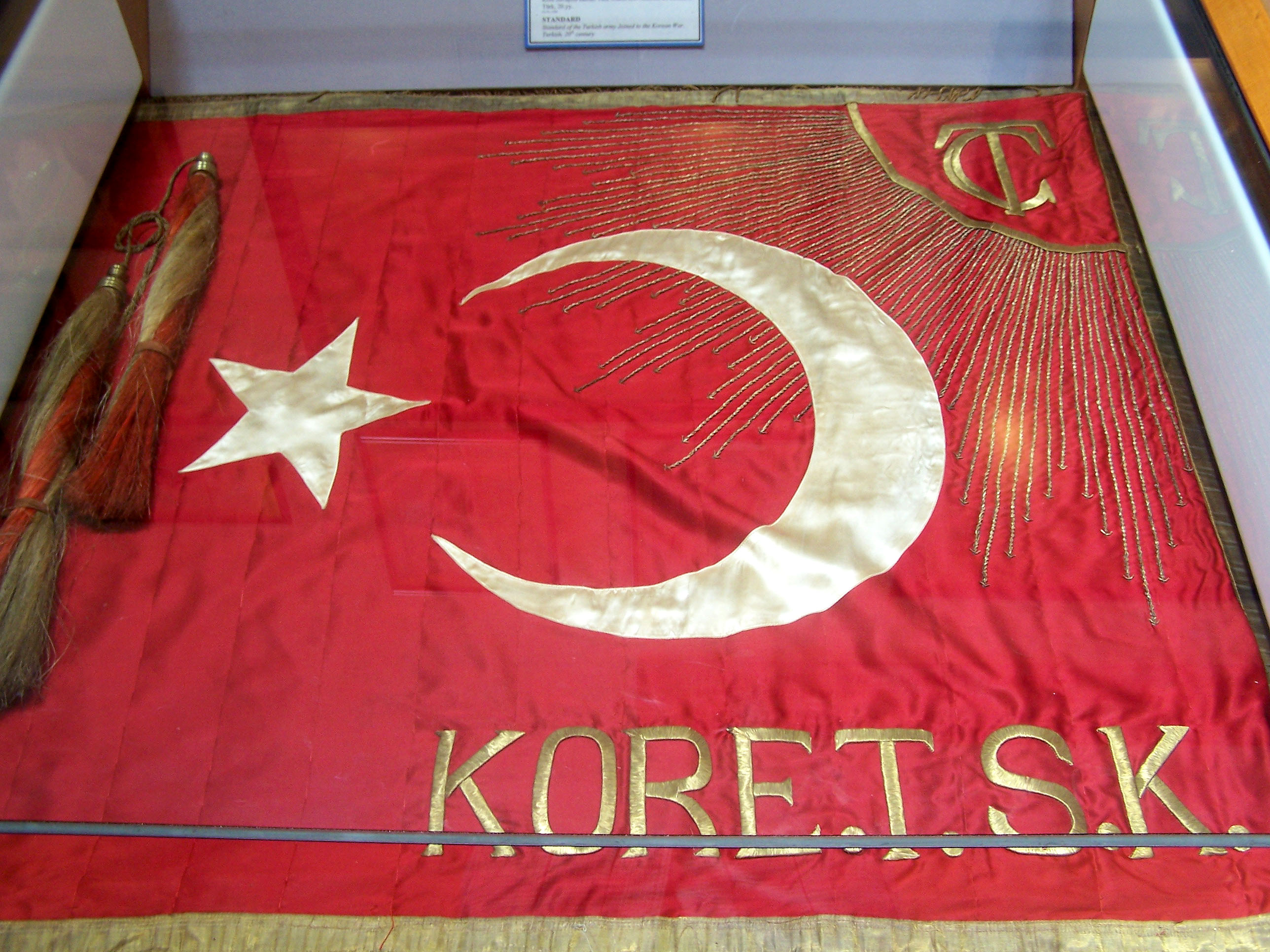
Standard of Turkish Armed Forces in the Korean War.

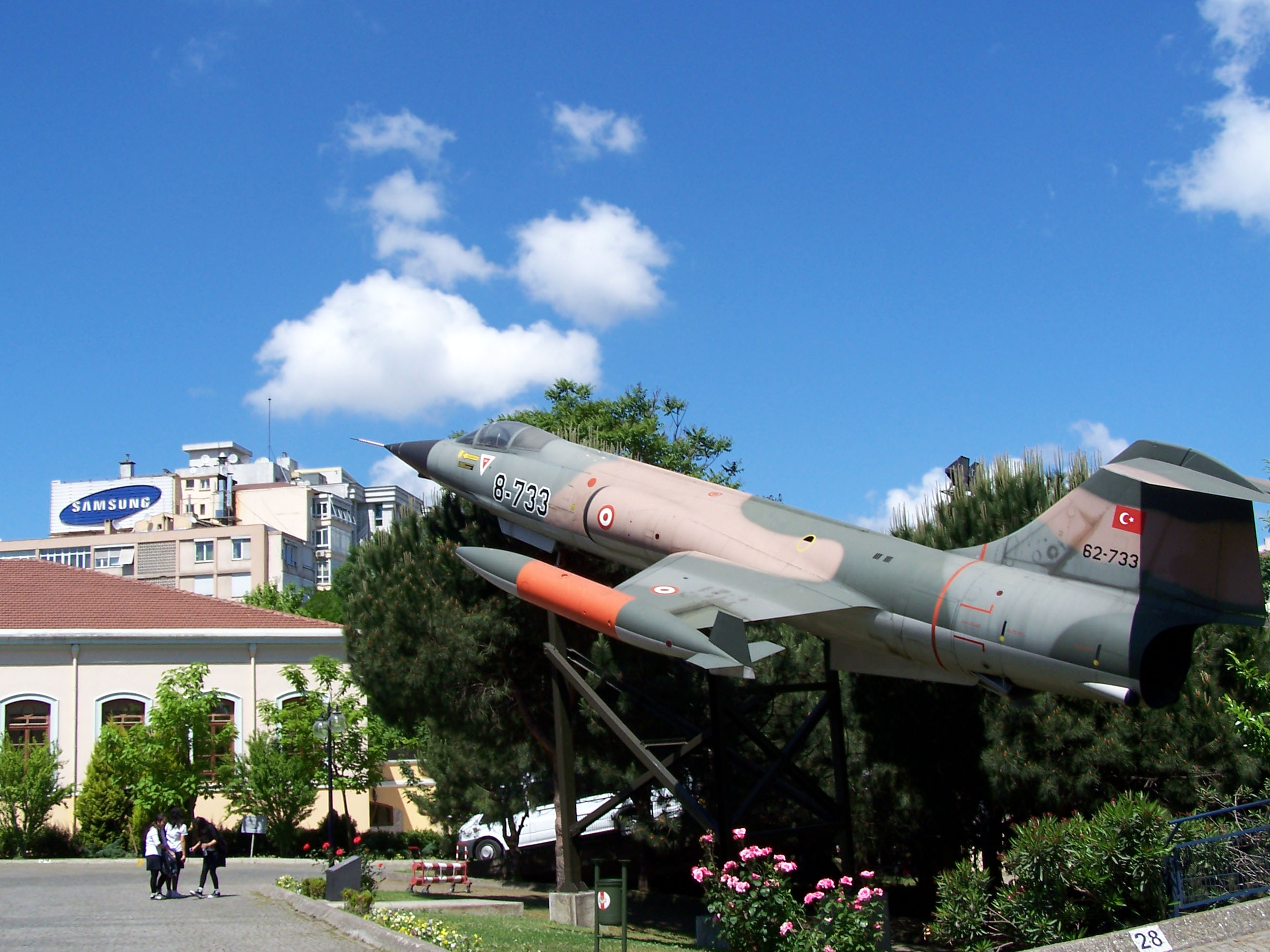
F-104 Starfighter

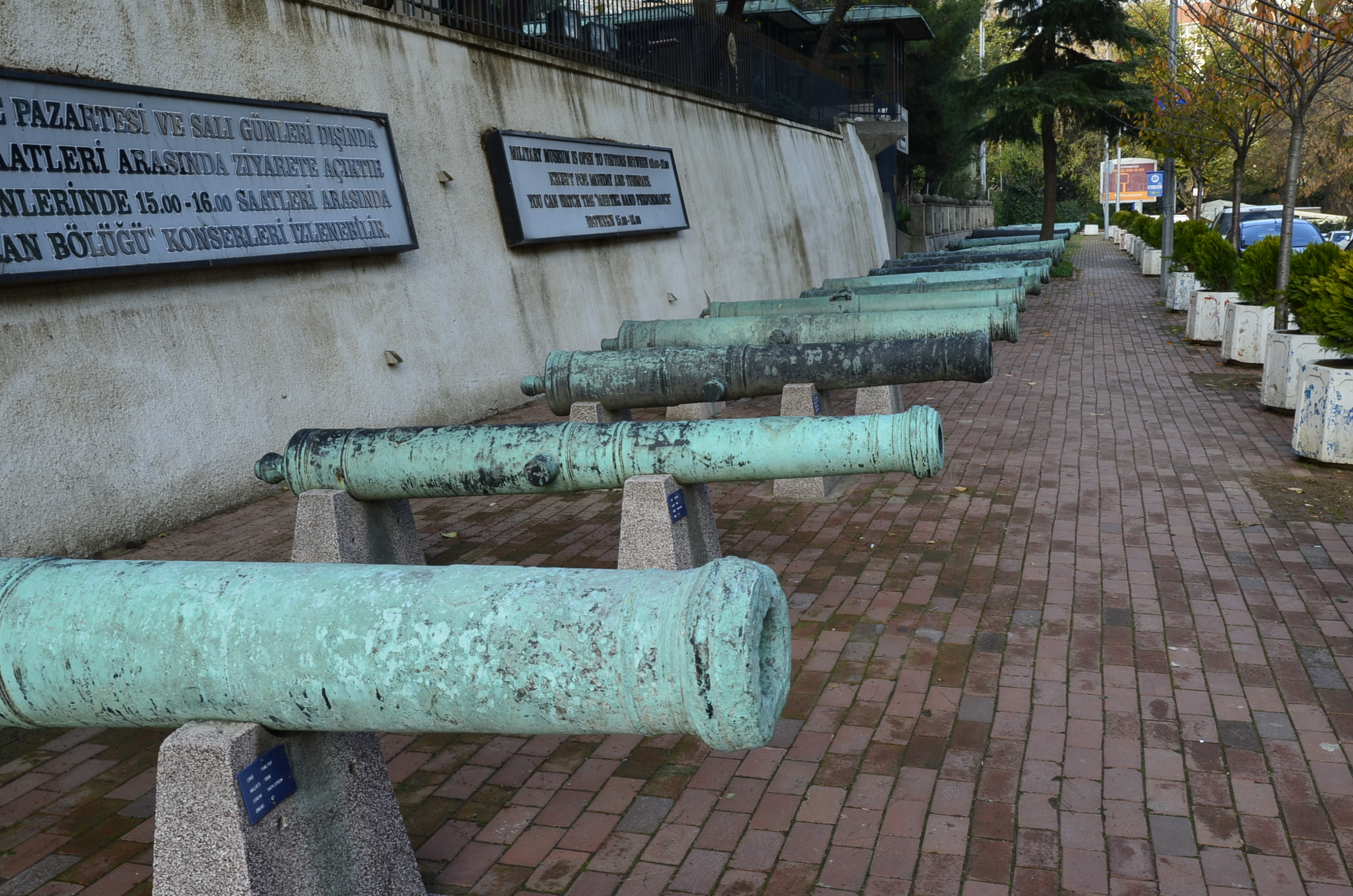
Cannons exhibited open-air in the backside street of the museum.

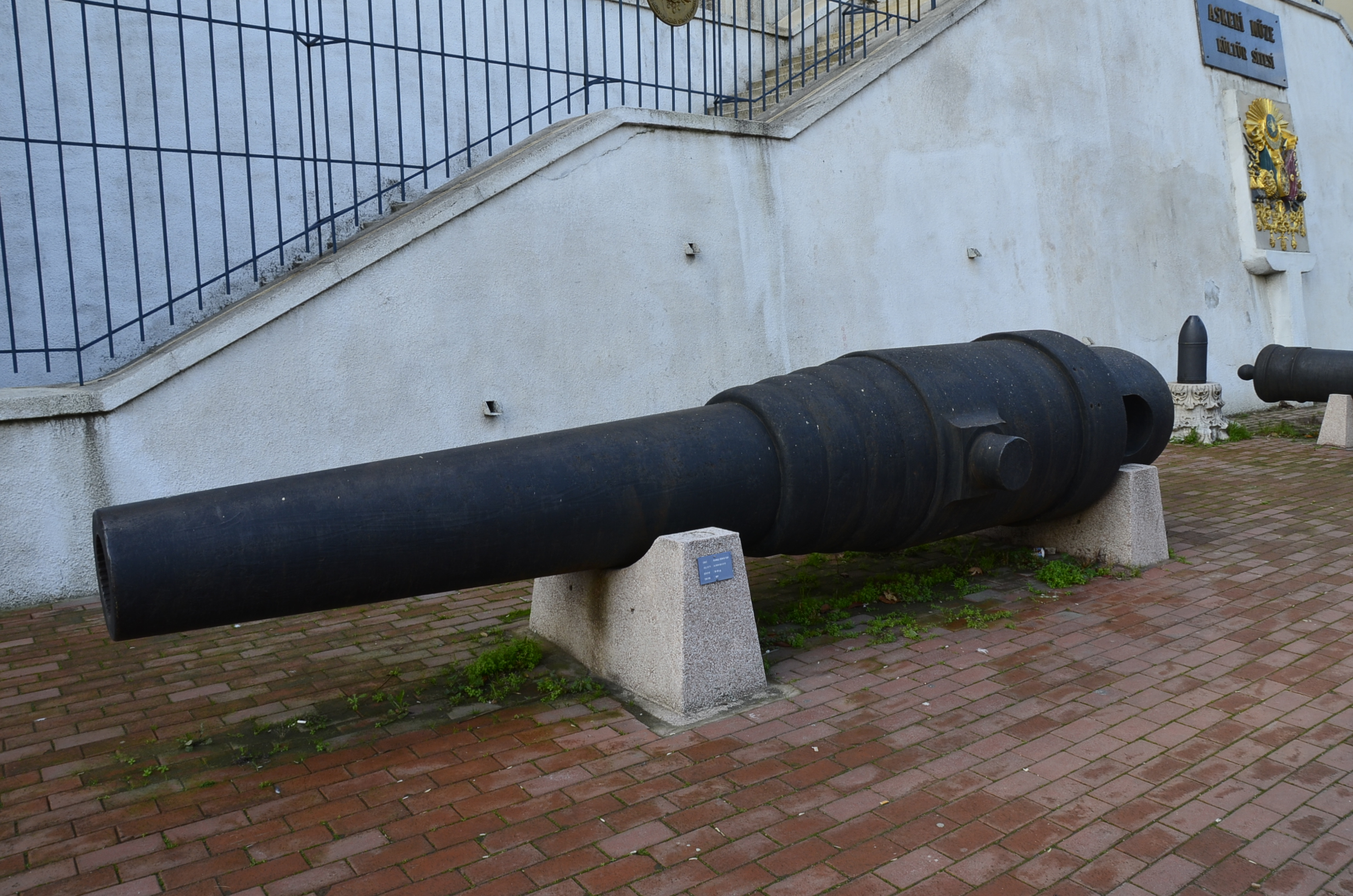
Cannons exhibited open-air behind the Istanbul Military Museum

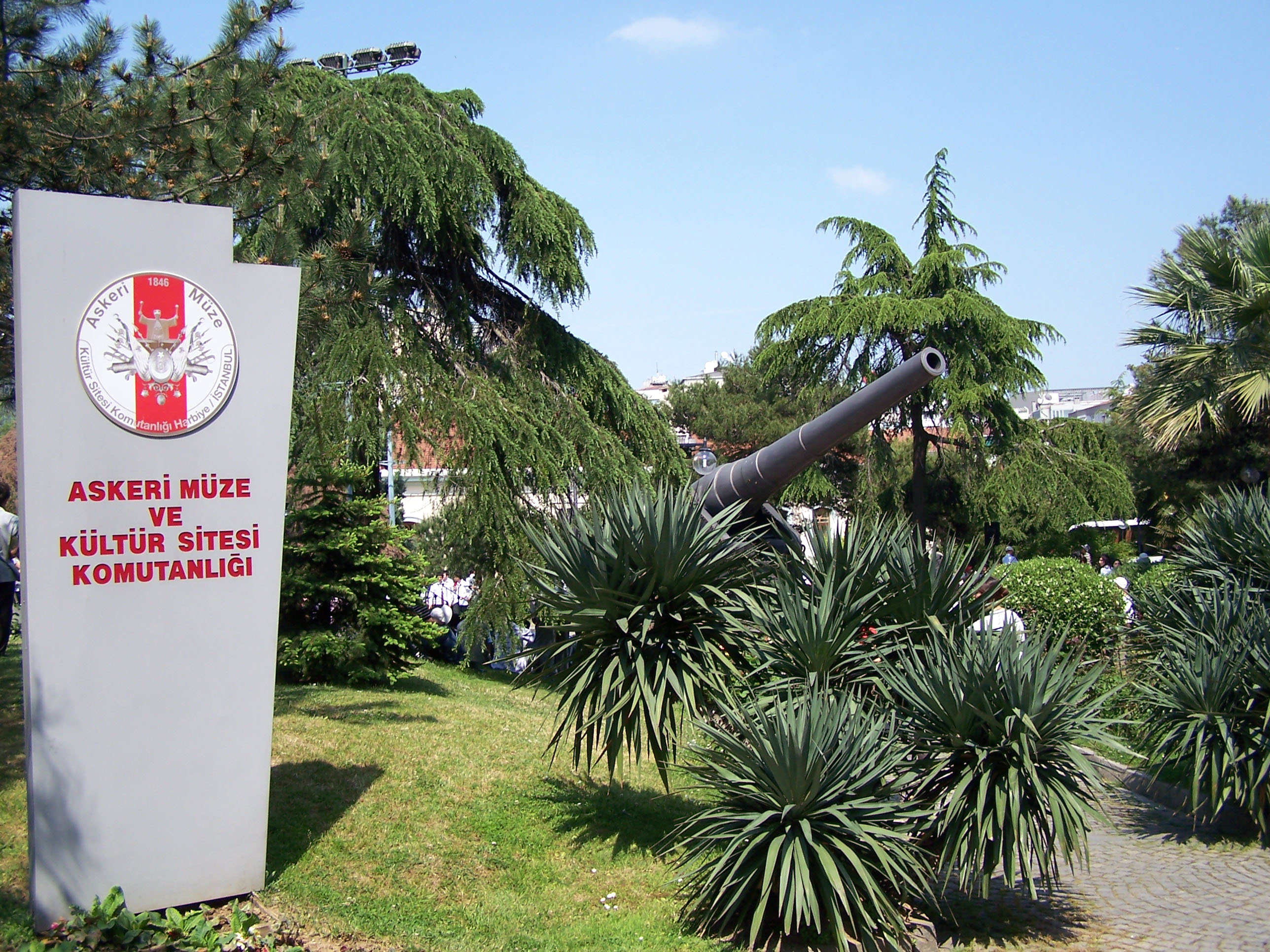

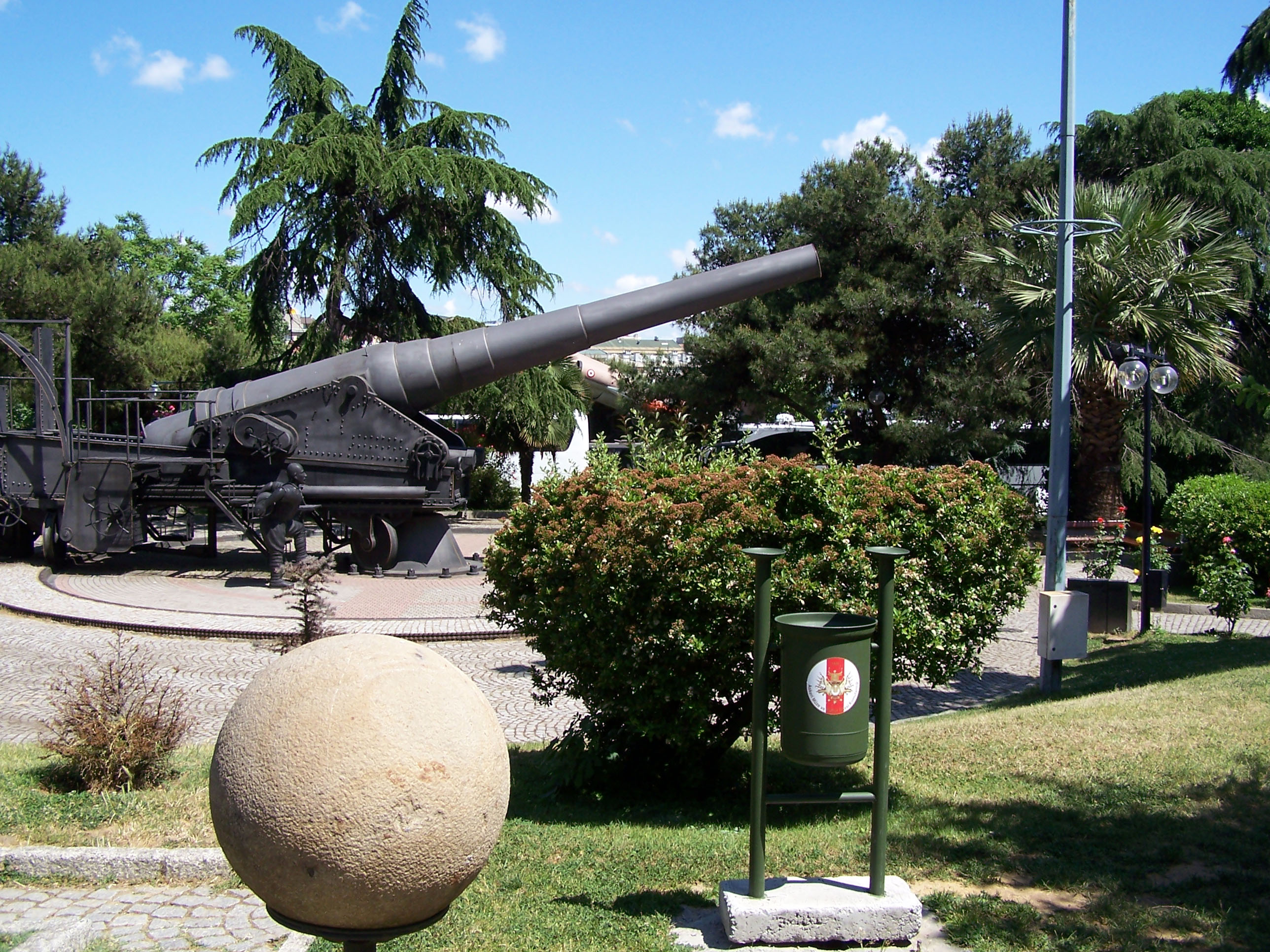

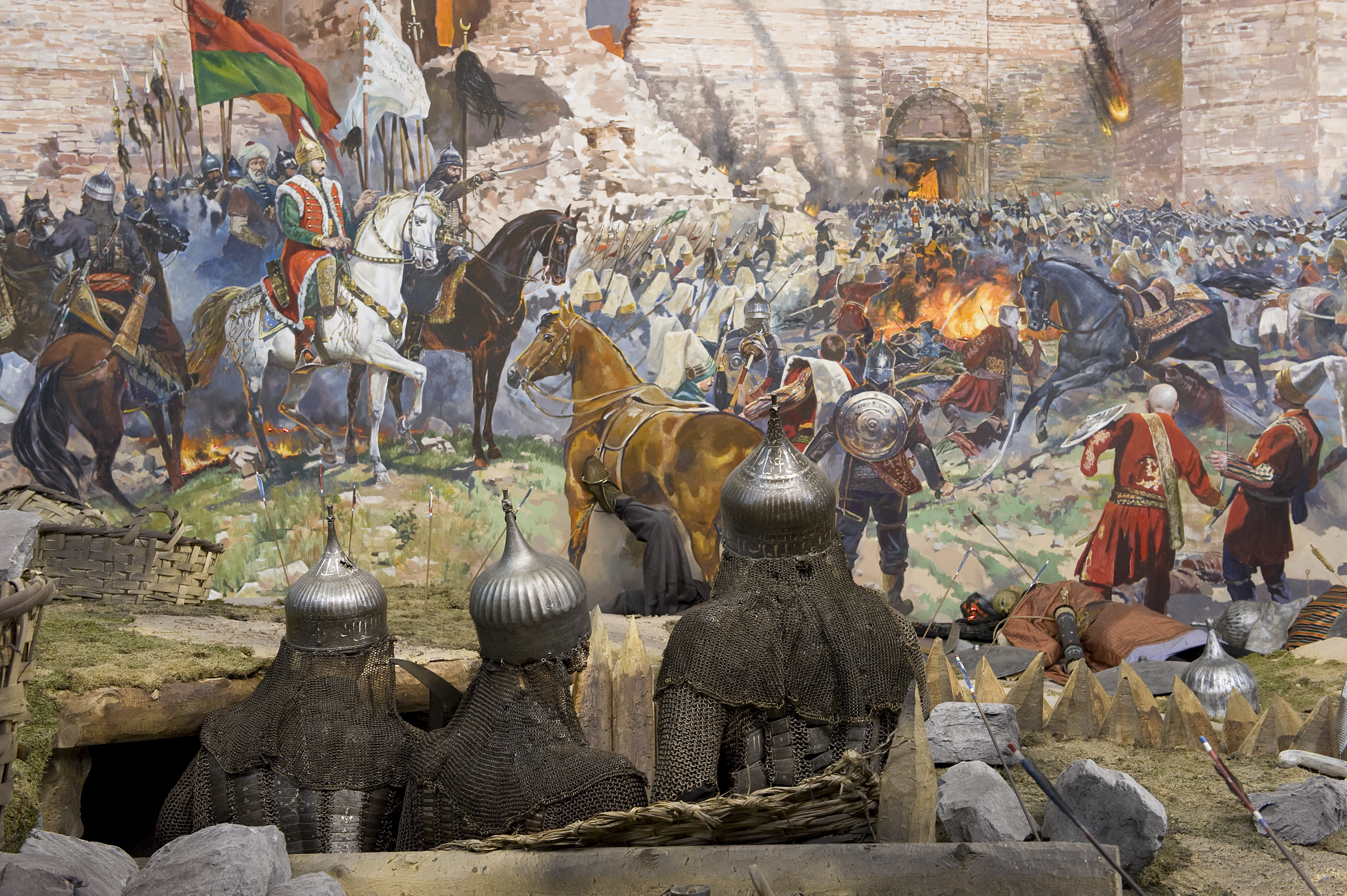
Istanbul Military Museum diorama conquest

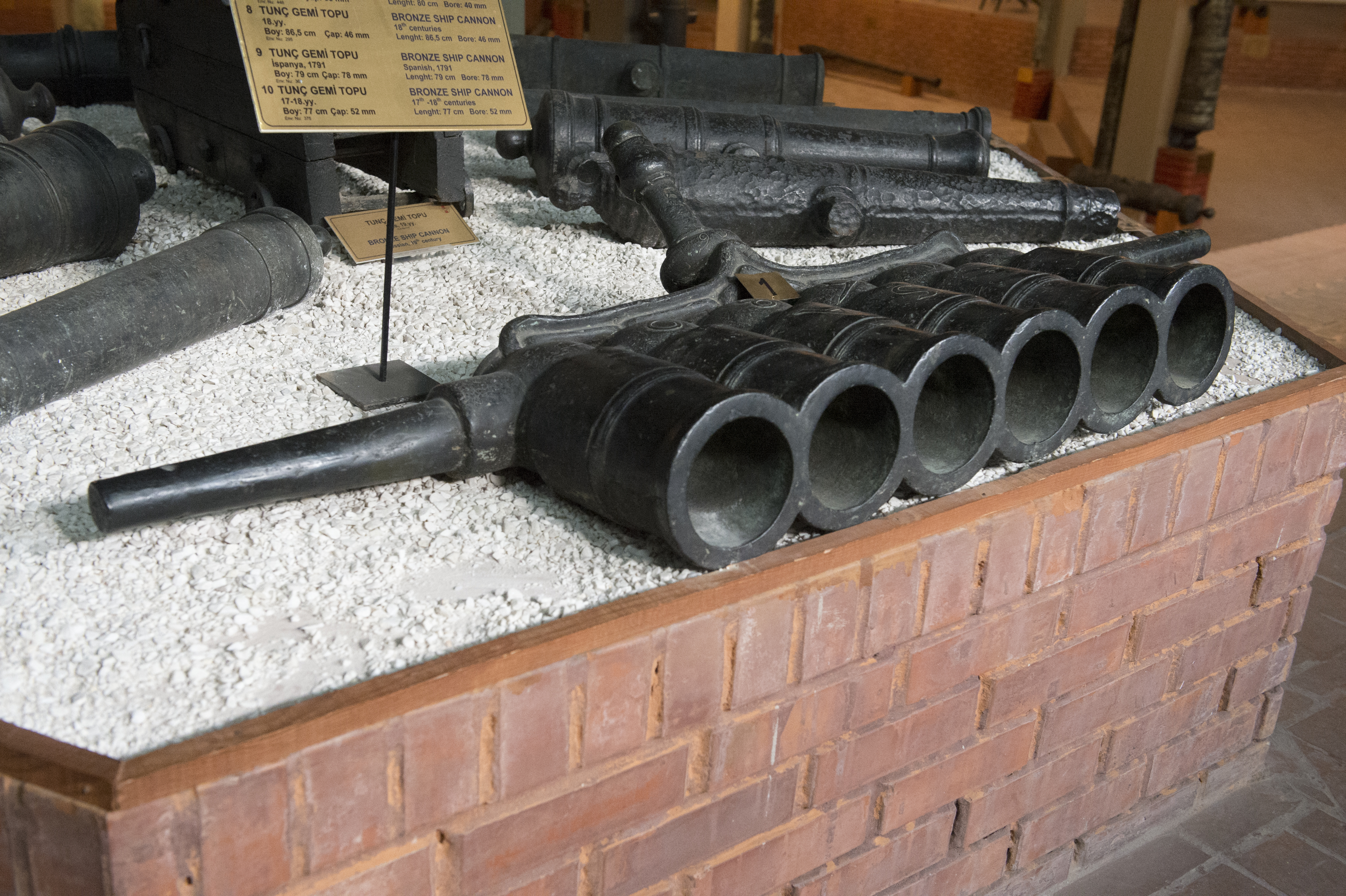
Istanbul Military museum Multi-barrel gun

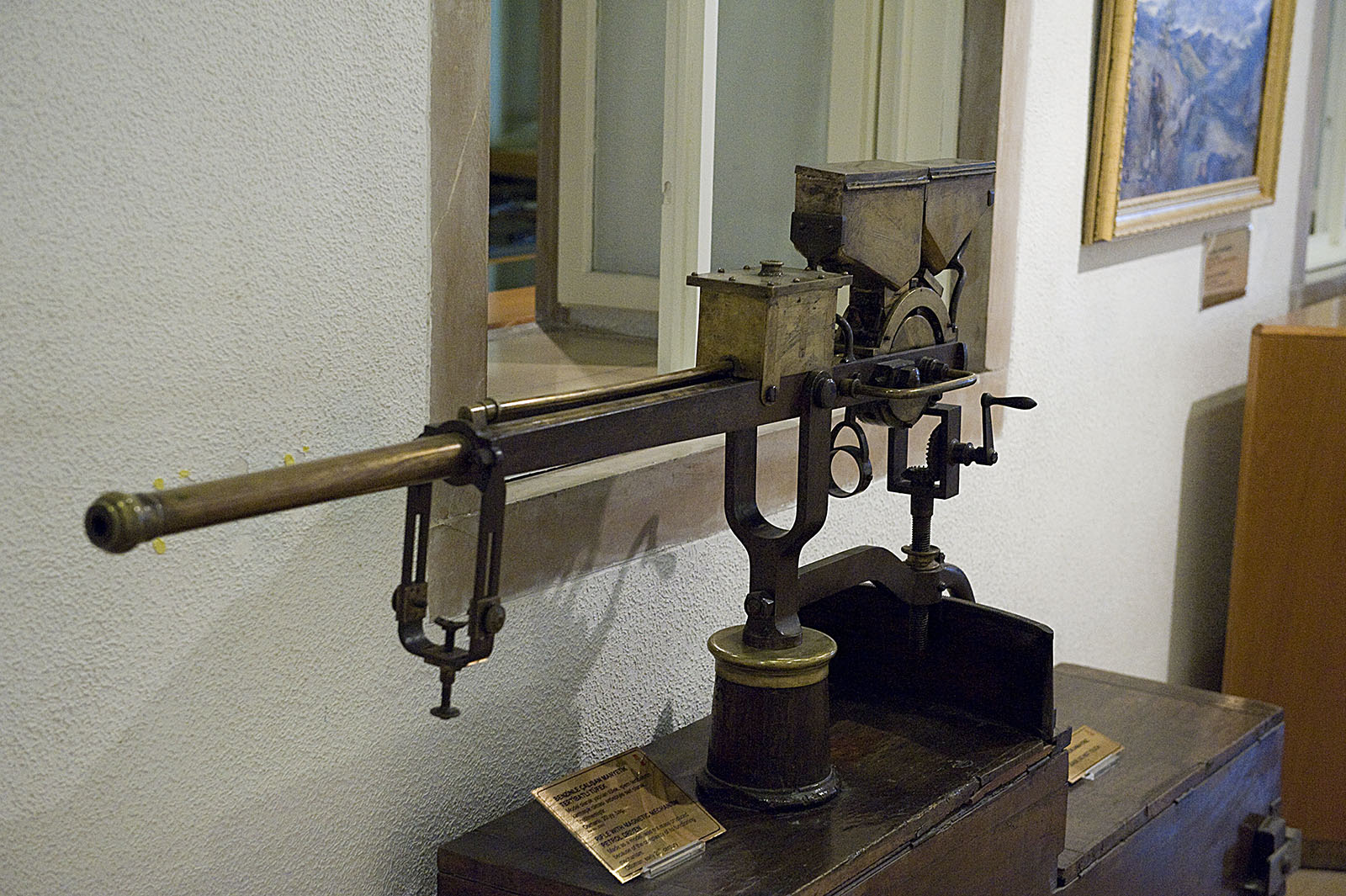
Istanbul Military Museum Gatling gun

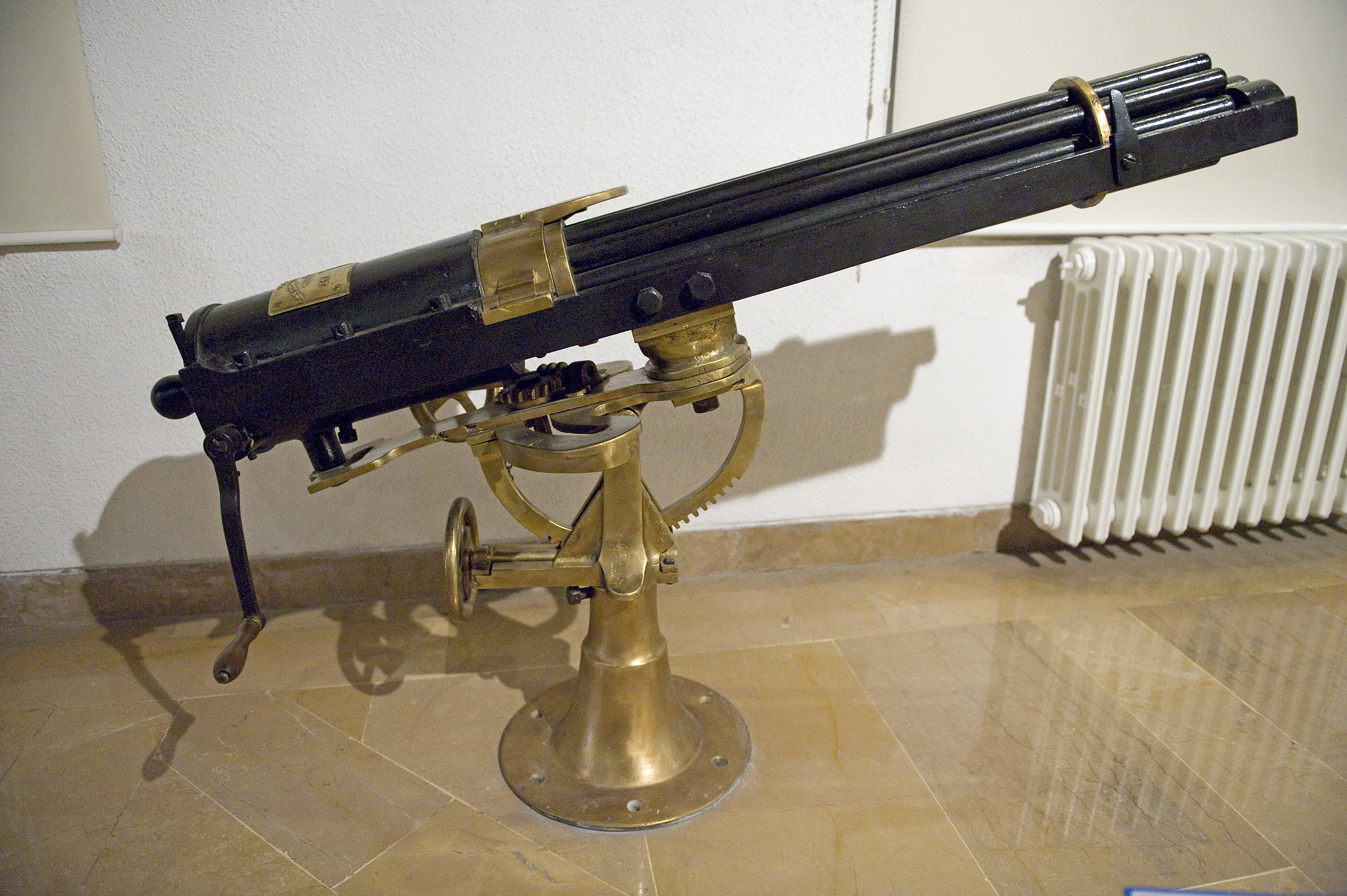
Istanbul Military Museum Ottoman gun

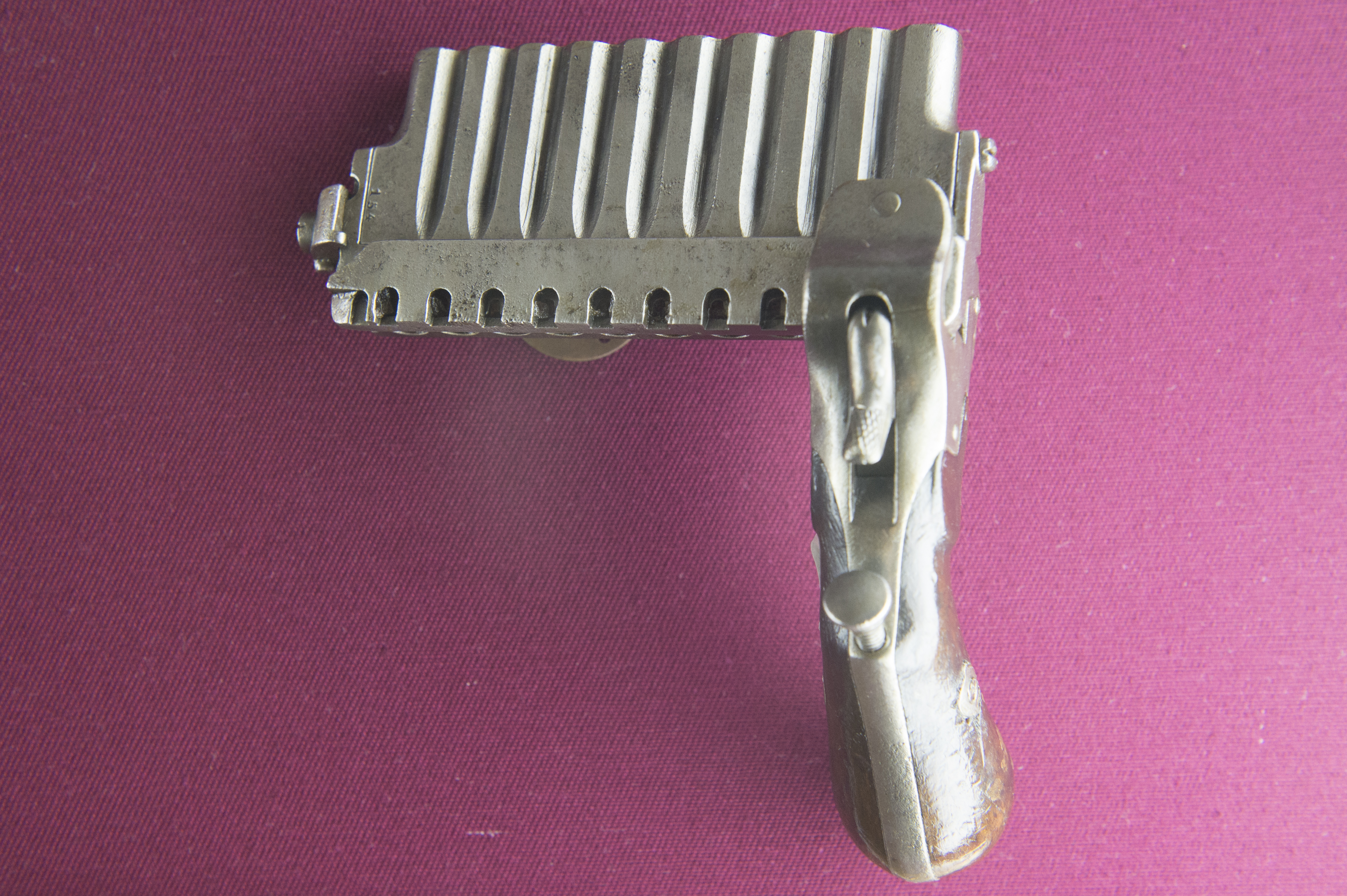
Istanbul Military Museum pinfire gun

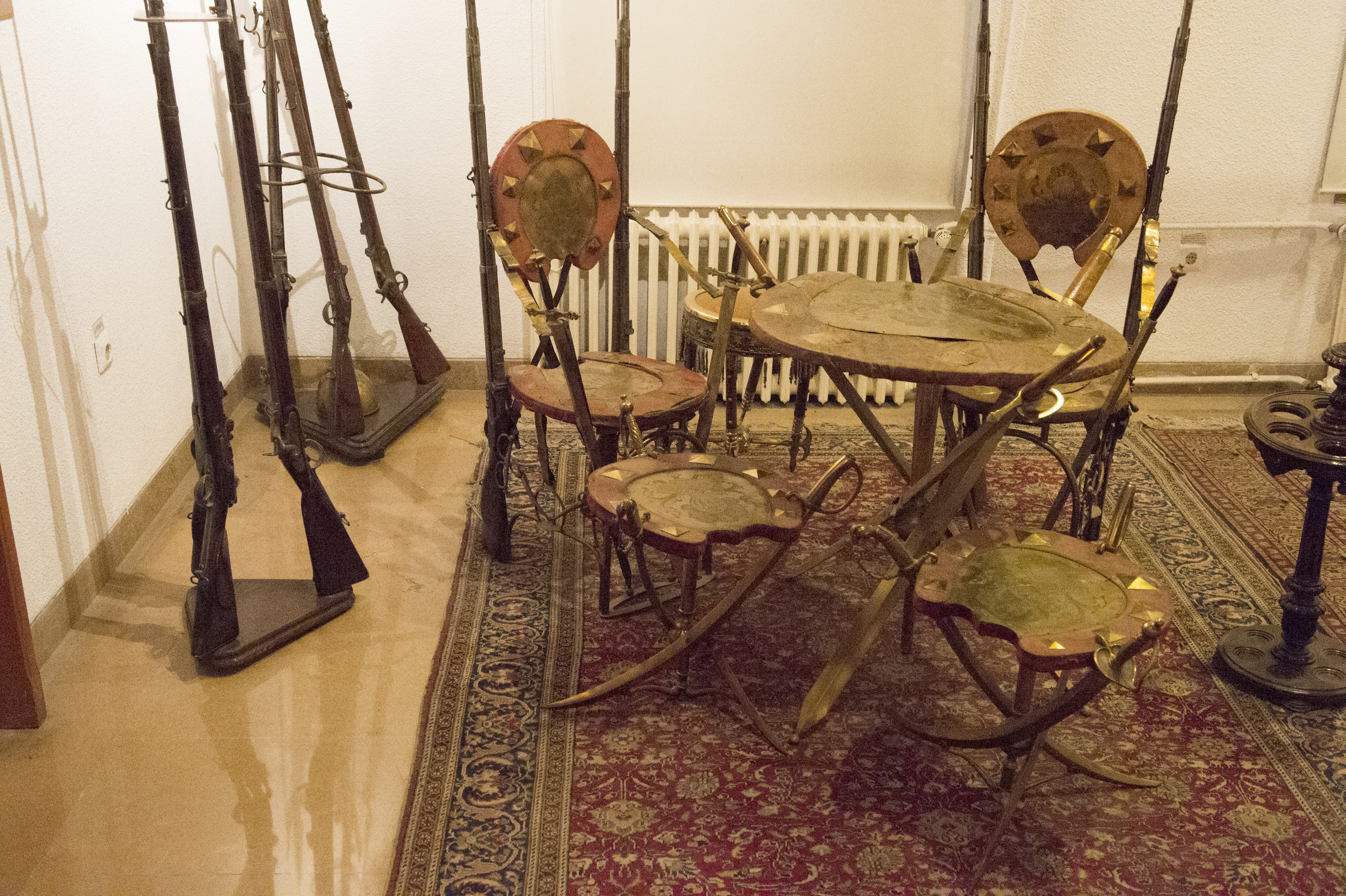
Istanbul Military Museum Recycled arms

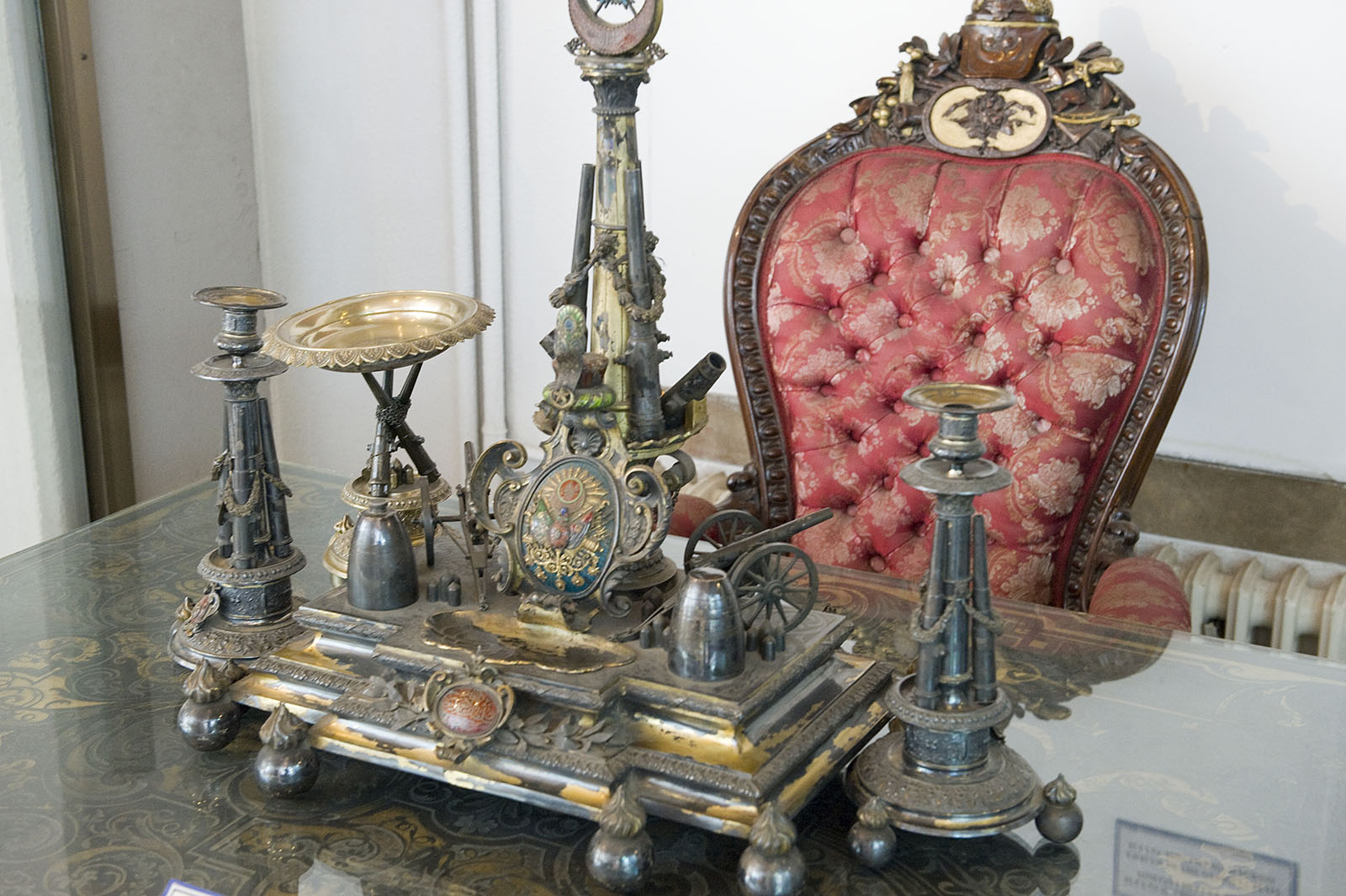
Istanbul Military Museum, Sultan Abdul Hamid II's desk

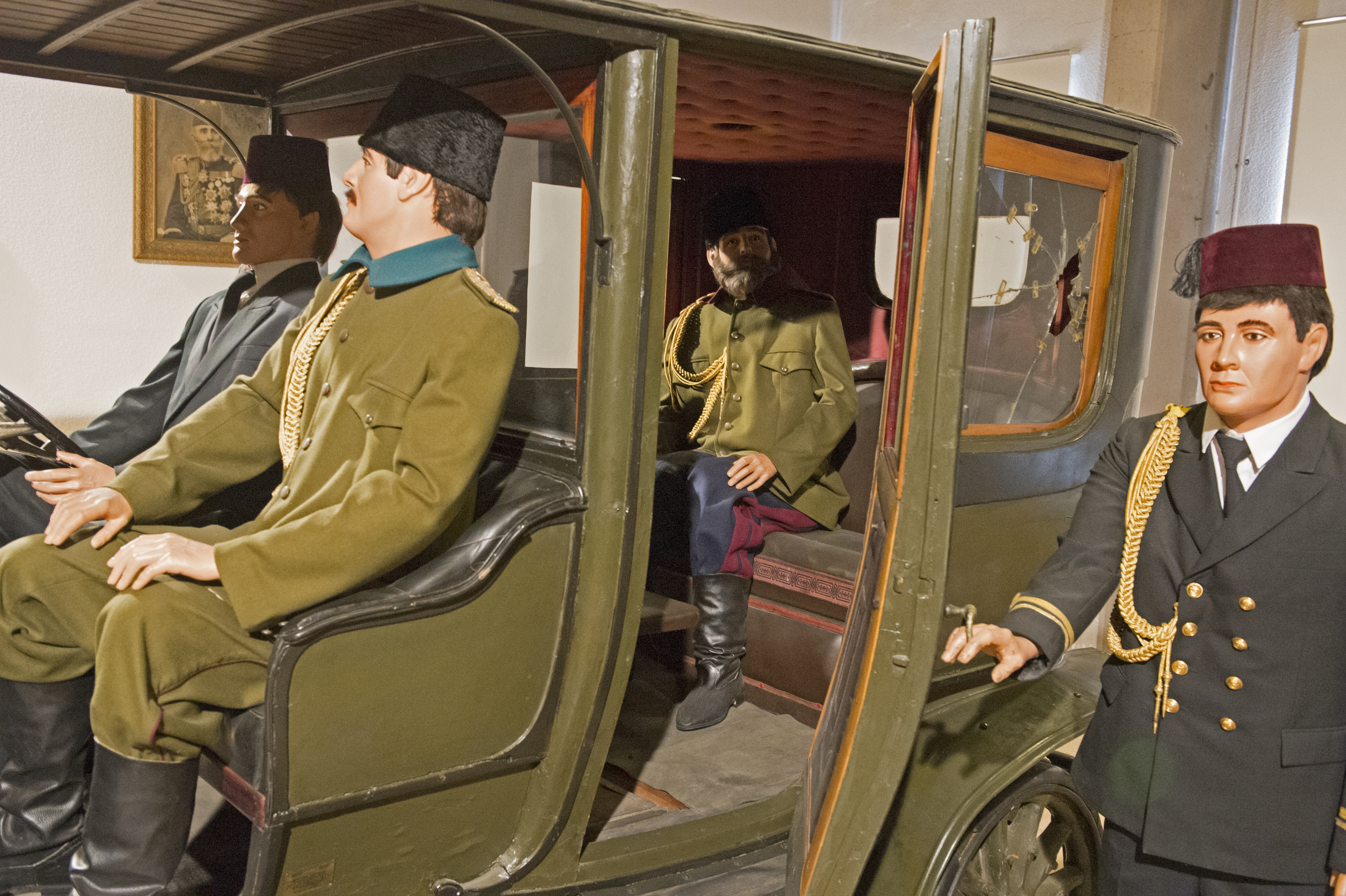
Istanbul Military Museum, Grand Vizier Mahmut Şevket Pasha's car

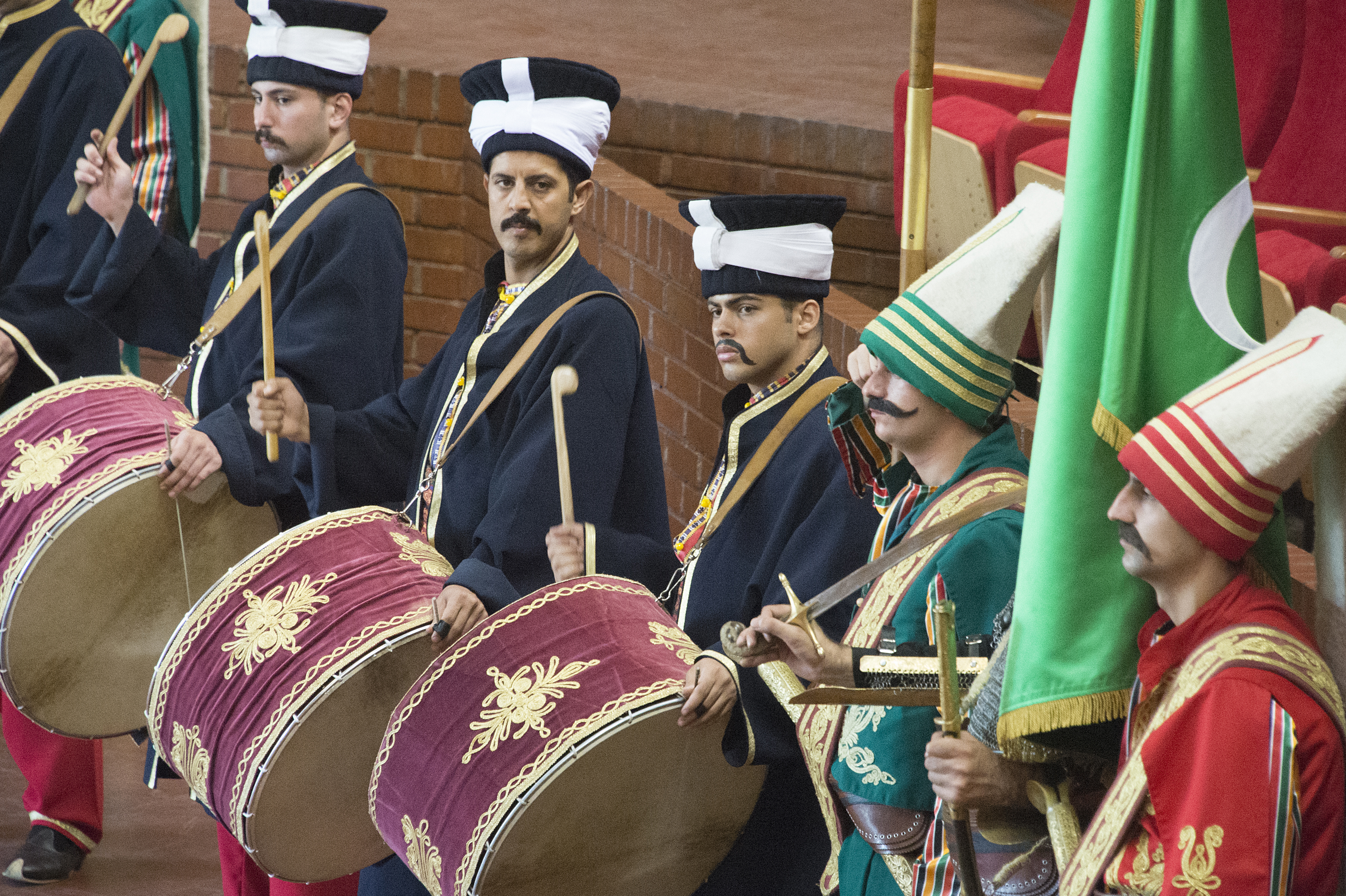
Istanbul Military Museum Mehter performance

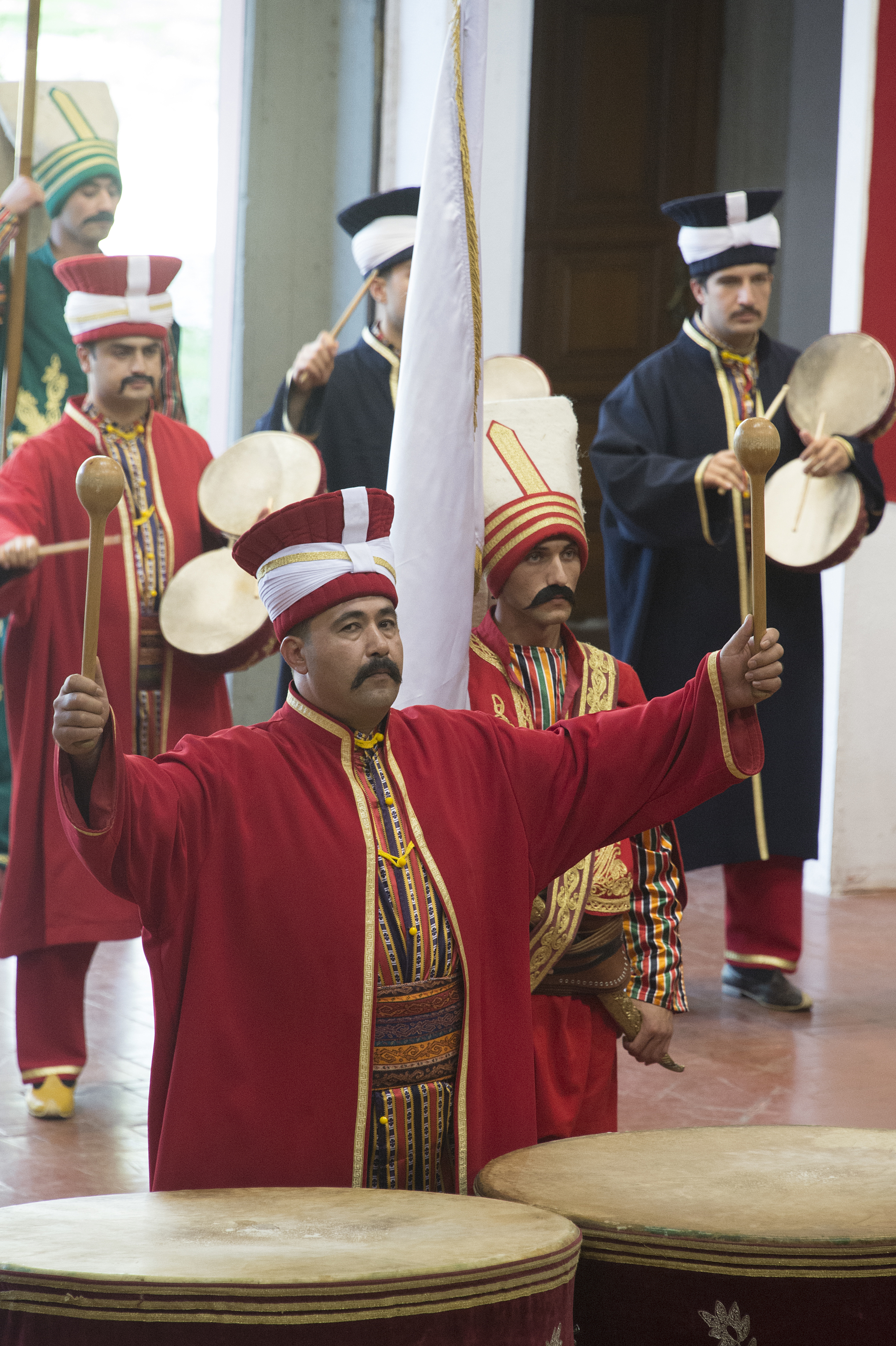
Istanbul Military Museum Mehter performance

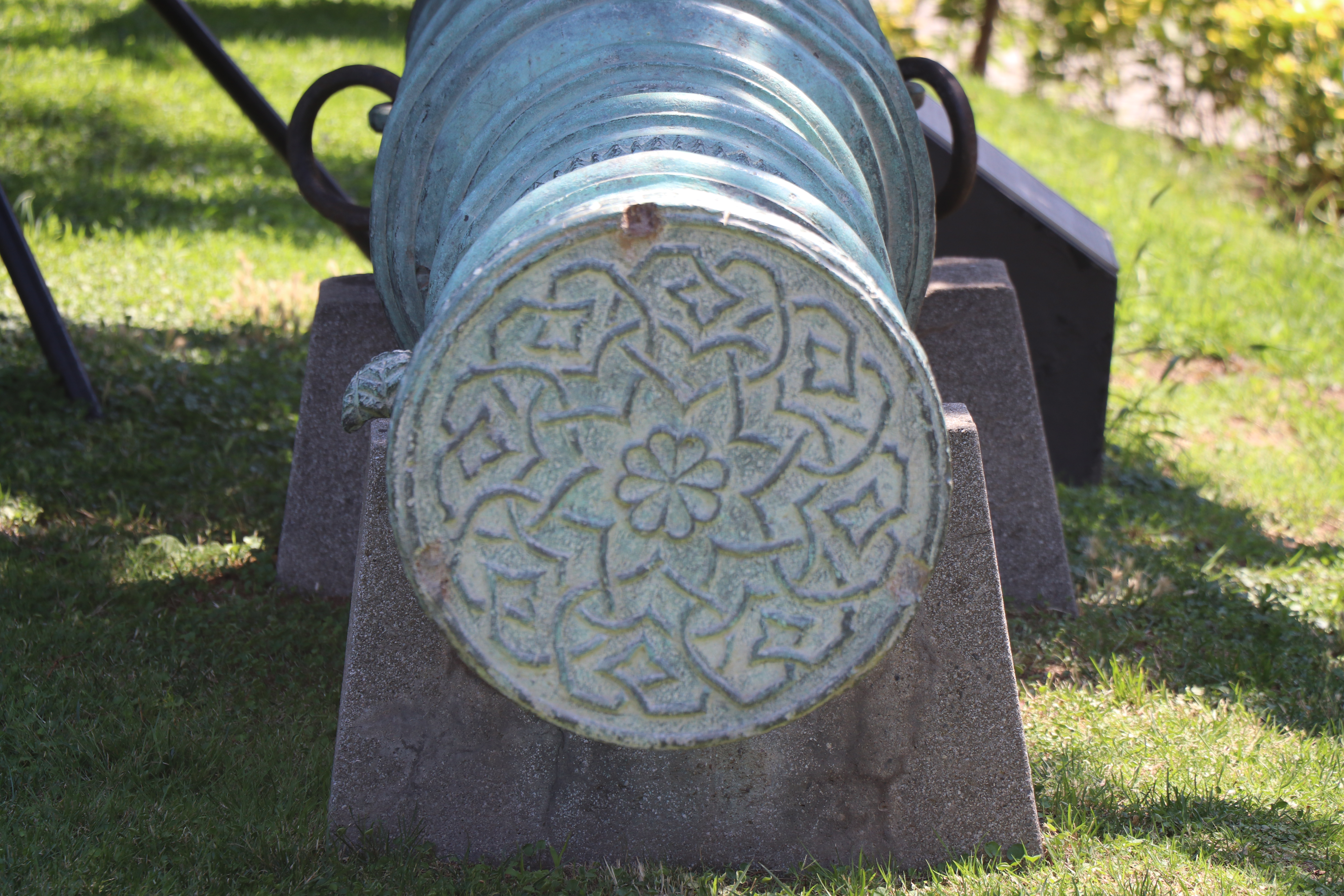
Istanbul Military Museum: Decoration on the barrel of a bronze cannon from 1400's

Decoration from a bronze cannon - Istanbul Military Museum
