= Sinan Ateş =

Turkish historian and politician (1984–2022)

Grey Wolves general chairman
- In office 9 January 2019 – 2 April 2020
- Preceded by: Olcay Kılavuz
- Succeeded by: Ahmet Yiğit Yıldırım

Personal details
- Born: 14 August 1984 Yukarımusalar, Dursunbey, Balıkesir, Turkey
- Died: 30 December 2022 (aged 38) Çankaya, Ankara, Turkey
- Cause of death: Assassination by gunshots
- Resting place: Amir Sultan Cemetery
- Party: Nationalist Movement Party
- Spouse: Ayşe Ateş
- Children: 2
- Education: Gazi University; Hacettepe University

Sinan Ateş (14 August 1984 – 30 December 2022) was a Turkish historian, academic and politician. He worked as a lecturer at Hacettepe University and served as the general chairman of the Nationalist Movement Party (MHP)'s Grey Wolves from 2019 to 2020. He was assassinated on 30 December 2022, and his assassination became one of the most popular topics in Turkey.

== Early life and education ==
He was born in 1984 in Dursunbey to a family that was originally from the village of Yukarımusalar. His father, Musa Ateş, was a Grey Wolf who survived an assassination attempt during the raging 1976–1980 Turkish political conflict.

He completed his primary and secondary education in Bursa. He graduated from the Osmangazi Ahmet Hamdi Gökbayrak Anatolian Teacher Preparation High School. In 2006, he graduated from Gazi University, Department of Social Studies Teaching. In 2009, he got his master's degree from the same university. He received his doctorate from Hacettepe University in 2018 and would work as a faculty member there.

== Early political career ==
Ateş, who joined Bursa Grey Wolves during his high school years, chaired the high school organization of the Grey Wolves. From 2007, he became the advisor of İsmet Büyükataman, Bursa Province Deputy of the MHP. He continued his consultancy until 2019. Ateş also chaired the FETÖ commission after the 2016 Turkish coup d'état attempt. The FETÖ commission was established under the MHP, before the MHP switched and began siding with the ruling AKP. When Meral Akşener attempted to replace Devlet Bahçeli as the MHP chair, he sided with Bahçeli.

== Presidential term ==
On 9 January 2019, Ateş was appointed as the leader of the Grey Wolves, replacing Olcay Kılavuz The first president of Grey Wolves to be a teacher and significantly educated, he wrote a large number of children's books. He also academicized the Grey Wolves Journal and increased its production from 10 thousand to 50 thousand. He founded a theater and organized plays in which schoolchildren took part in. He founded the environmentalist wing of the Grey Wolves, which carries out activities such as recycling, planting, helping stray cats and dogs, as well as saving endangered species.

On 29 March 2020, he reacted to the Islamist author Yavuz Bahadıroğlu, who was known for his anti-Atatürk and anti-Kemalist views, criticising the TRT TV series Ya İstiklâl Ya Ölüm ("Either Independence or Death"). Referring to Bahadıroğlu and another Islamist author Kadir Mısıroğlu, Sinan Ateş mentioned, "these community microbes are more dangerous for Turkish children than the coronavirus."

=== Resignation and after ===
Ateş was asked to resign by Devlet Bahçeli from this position on 2 April 2020, citing his individual academic studies and his position at Hacettepe University as more important. Ateş talked to Devlet Bahçeli about this issue in order to continue as an academic, and Bahçeli replied, "go, continue your education"

In 2021, he became a hot topic for insulting atheists.

== Death ==
On 30 December 2022, Ateş was attacked together with his brother in law Selman Bozkurt by Eray Özyağcı, who was hiding behind a vehicle at 1456th Street in the Kızılırmak District of Çankaya. One bullet fired by Özyağcı accidentally hit Bozkurt and five bullets hit Ateş. Bozkurt was injured in his shoulder, Ateş was seriously injured and died on the way to the hospital. The motive for his assassination was politically motivated. In connection with Ateş's death, a total of 13 people were arrested, including an MHP provincial director and two officers of the special police unit PÖH. One of the suspects, who was a high-ranking Grey Wolves member, was arrested at the house of Olcay Kilavuz, who Sinan Ateş took his place as leader of the Grey Wolves.

He is the first Grey Wolves official to die by getting shot.

=== Funeral and memory ===
On 31 December 2022, the funeral prayer was held in Bursa Ulu Mosque and he was buried in Amir Sultan Cemetery. To his funeral, the mayor of Bursa, AKP, DEVA Party, IYI Party, MHP officials, and many Bursaspor supporters attended. The nationalists attending the funeral said, "The Grey Wolves are here, where are the jackals?". He was put in a coffin wrapped with a Flag of Turkey and a Bursaspor scarf, and was buried in the grave with martyrdom written on its stone. HDP Kocaeli Province Deputy Ömer Faruk Gergerlioğlu said that Ateş's funeral was the most crowded in Bursa after Zeki Müren's funeral.

Gökçeada Municipality, led by the IYI Party, announced that it will name a street after Ateş.

On 3 January, a grieving Devlet Bahçeli finished his party's parliamentary meeting and was questioned by a journalist about the murder of Sinan Ateş. Bahçeli pushed the journalist away and told her 'Mind your own business'.

Meral Akşener, on 4 January, during a parliamentary speech, stated: "Mr. Erdoğan, so I'm asking you, what is going on in this country that you claim to rule but obviously cannot? Tell me, what kind of foolishness is this? The responsibility is yours, Mr. Erdoğan. They are trying to cover up the real killers by using the power of the state."

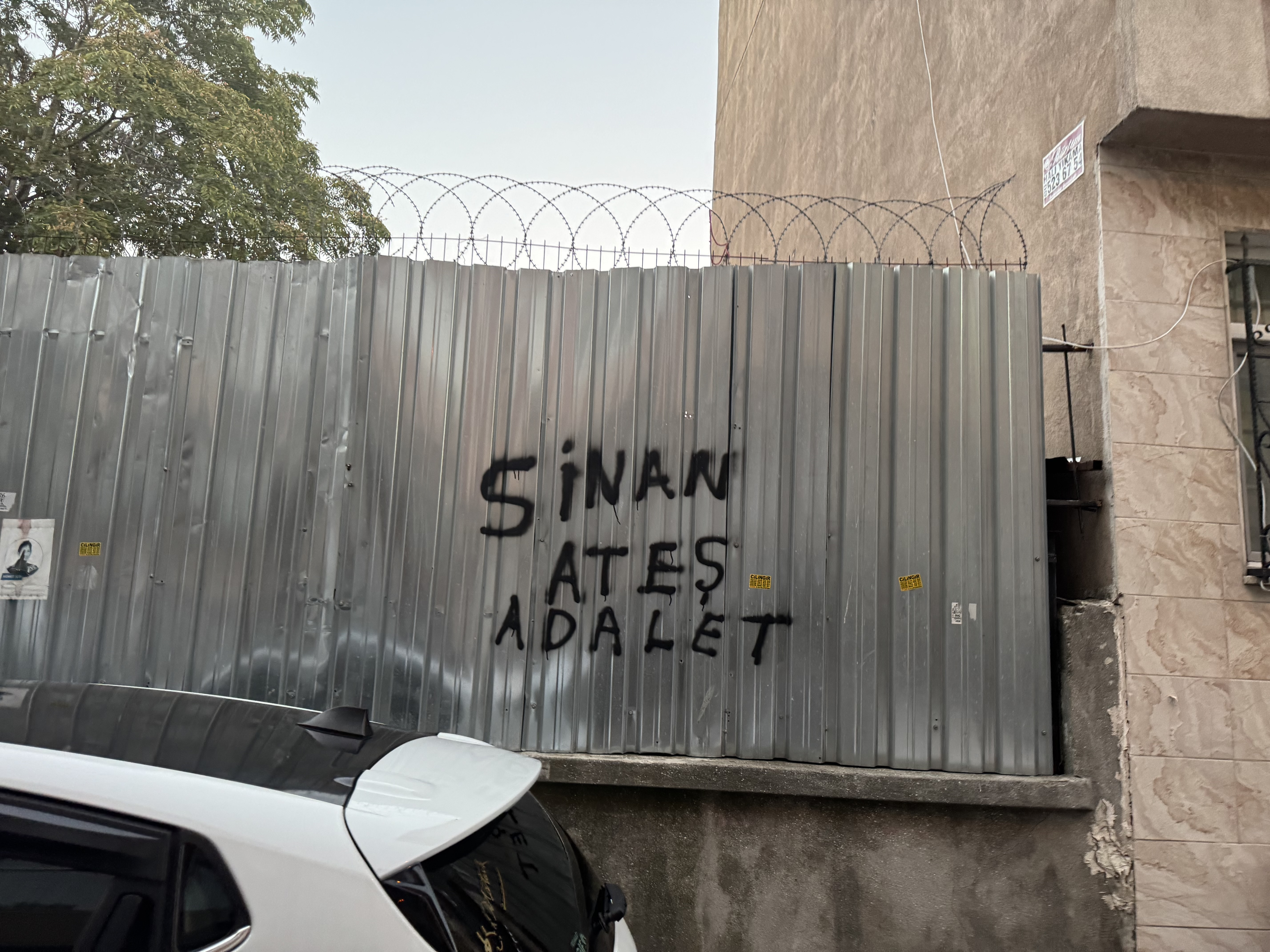
Graffiti from Fatih which is about Sinan Ateş's death and says "Justice for Sinan Ateş"

Remzi Çayır visited the family of Sinan Ateş in Bursa.

== Personal life ==
Sinan Ateş was married to Ayşe Ateş. The couple had two daughters, Bengisu and Banuçiçek. He was an avid Bursaspor supporter. His uncle is an official of the MHP.
