= Baha Cemal Zağra =

Turkish politician

Baha Cemal Zağra (1894, Stara Zagora - 29 July 1976) was a Turkish politician.

== Life and career ==
He was a high school graduate. He served as the Chairman of the Board of Directors of the Bursa Chamber of Commerce and Industry, a member and the 2nd chairman of the Provincial Assembly, the Deputy Chairman of the Municipal Assembly, the 10th and 1st (12) Term Bursa Deputy of the Grand National Assembly of Turkey. He was married and had three children.
