= Celal Sönmez =

12th President of the BTSO
- In office 1 December 1995 – 13 May 2013
- Preceded by: Ali Osman Sönmez
- Succeeded by: İbrahim Burkay

Personal details
- Born: May 17, 1953 (age 73) İnegöl, Bursa, Turkey
- Spouse: Ümran Sönmez
- Children: Ali Cem Sönmez; Cemil Sönmez; Osman Sönmez
- Education: Istanbul University Faculty of Business Administration
- Occupation: Industrialist and businessman

Celal Sönmez (born 17 May 1953, Bursa) is a Turkish businessman, industrialist, entrepreneur and media owner.

== Life ==
Sönmez was born in İnegöl in 1953. He completed primary school in İnegöl and graduated from Bursa Erkek Lisesi. In 1977, he graduated from the Istanbul University Faculty of Business Administration. After military service, he began working in the industrial enterprises of Sönmez Holding, owned by his father Ali Osman Sönmez. He held various posts including vice chairman and chairman of the board. After his father's death, he became chairman of Sönmez Holding.

He also served as chairman of the board of Sönmez Media Group, which included AS TV, Radyo S, Bursa Hakimiyet, Yaşayan Bursa and the Bursa News Agency.

In December 2024, he transferred ownership of Sönmez Media Group to Istanbul-based ACG Media, thereby exiting the media sector.

== Bursa Chamber of Commerce and Industry ==
Sönmez was first elected as a member of the assembly of the Bursa Chamber of Commerce and Industry (BTSO) in 1984. He also served on the High Advisory Board of BUSİAD and the board of directors of the Uludağ Exporters’ Association. From 1995 to 2013, he was president of BTSO. He continues to chair Sönmez Holding, which operates 28 companies across nine sectors.

== Personal life ==
He is married to Ümran Sönmez and has three children.
