= Bursa Chamber of Commerce and Industry =

Profession chamber

- Bursa Chamber of Commerce and Industry
- BCCI
- Type: Chamber of commerce
- Headquarters: Bursa, Turkey
- Board Chair: İbrahim Burkay

Bursa Chamber of Commerce and Industry (BCCI) is a professional association that started its activities in Bursa in 1889. The association continues its activities in its building in Bursa Organized Industrial Zone. The association took part in the realization of the Bursa Organized Industrial Zone which is the first organized industrial zone of the country. Establishment of a cycle power plant in the industrial zone to generate electricity from natural gas; The establishment of the Bursa International Fair Center and its pioneering in the establishment of the Bursa Free Zone are among the significant works carried out by BCCI.

As of 2018, the most registered members of BCCI are in construction (20%), retail trade (15%), textile and ready-made clothing (10%), food, agriculture and livestock (9%). In 2008, BCCI was given an outstanding service award by the Grand National Assembly of Turkey.

== Main purpose ==
The aim of BCCI is to meet the common needs of the members, to facilitate their professional activities, to ensure the development of the sector, to ensure the superiority of honesty and trust in the interaction of the members with each other and with the public, and to maintain professional discipline and harmony.

== History ==
The association was established on June 6, 1889, under the name "Bursa Chamber of Commerce", with the initiative of businessmen from Bursa, in Koza Han under the name Bursa Chamber of Commerce. Then, it became a Chamber of Commerce and Industry by merging with the Chamber of Industry established a year later. 70 new members were registered in 1889, 105 new members in 1890, 14 new members in 1891, 8 new members in 1892, and 42 new members in 1893. In 1927, the number of chamber members reached 1815.

BCCI continued its work in a small room belonging to Bursa Municipality after 1906, and then in three rooms belonging to itself behind Emir Han. In 1938 it moved to a building of its own. A new building was built between 1971 and 1973. After continuing its activities in this building between 1973 and 1999, it moved to the new service building built in the Organized Industrial Zone in 1999.

== Former presidents ==
- Sait Ete (1940- 1951)
- Baha Cemal Zağra (1951- 1954)
- Hayri Terzioğlu (1954- 1960)
- Hasan Alkoçlar (1960- 1963)
- Kamil Tolon (1963- 1965)
- Abdi Biçen (1965- 1969)
- Hüseyin Sungur (1969- 1972)
- Selahattin Aktar (1973- 1975)
- Ali Osman Sönmez (1975- 1995)
- Celal Sönmez (1995- 2013)

== Bibliography ==
- Bursa Ticaret ve Sanayi Odası İlk Karar Defteri, 1889–1904. BTSO 120. Yılı, Bursa Ticaret ve Sanayi Odası, 2009 Access date: 12 March 2022
- Bursa İl Yıllığı, (1973), Ajans Türk Matbaacılık Sanayi, Access date: 12 March 2022
- Trade with Turkey, a Businessman's Guide and Directory, United States. Economic Cooperation Administration, Access date: 12 March 2022
