= Amir Sultan Cemetery =

Cemetery in Bursa, Turkey

Coordinates: 40°10′55″N 29°04′48″E

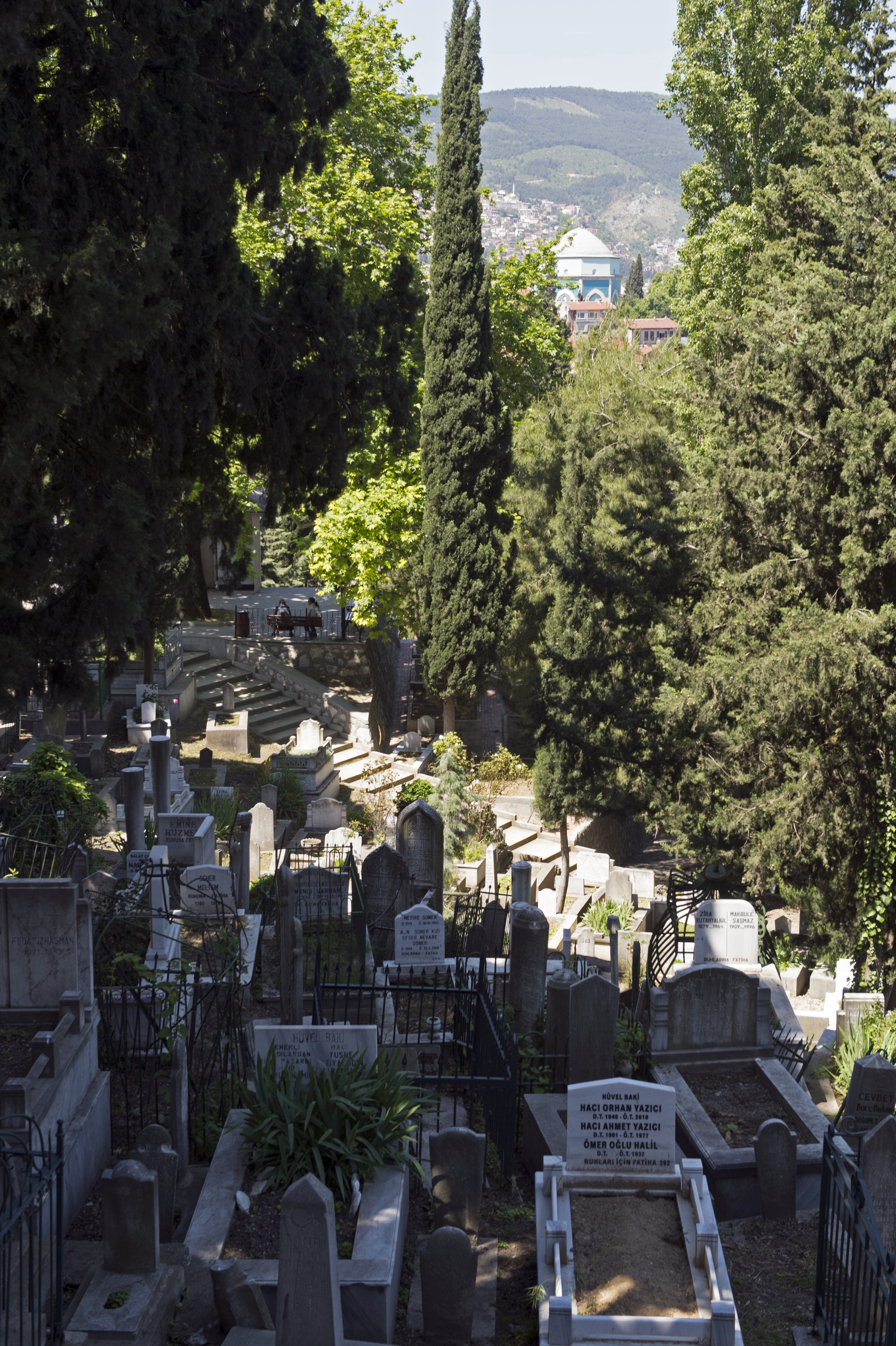
- Interactive map of Amir Sultan Cemetery

Details
- Established: 15th century
- Location: Bursa
- Country: Turkey

Amir Sultan Cemetery is a historical cemetery located in Yıldırım district of Bursa. The cemetery is named after the Islamic philosopher Amir Sultan.

== History ==
In the 14th century, after the Amir Sultan Mosque was built in the region during the Ottoman period and Amir Sultan's funeral was buried in the region, the people of Bursa wanted to bury the deceased people here. Upon this request, the area next to the mosque was turned into a cemetery. With the construction of the mosque and the cemetery, the population in the region increased and Emirsultan district was established. Most of Bursa's famous people were buried in this cemetery.

== Notable burials ==
- Ali Osman Sönmez
- Kamil Tolon
- Mehmed Baha Pars
- Mümin Gençoğlu (1932–1993)
- Reşat Oyal
- Zeki Müren (1931–1996)
- Sinan Ateş (1984-2022)
