= Ali Osman Sönmez =

Turkish politician and businessperson (1926-2001)

- Born: 1926; Momchilgrad
- Died: 12 October 2001 (aged 74–75)
- Political party: True Path Party
- Children: Celal Sönmez, Kubilay Enez

Ali Osman Sönmez (1926 – 12 October 2001) was a Turkish politician and businessperson.

== Life and career ==
Ali Osman Sönmez, who was born in Momchilgrad in Bulgaria in 1926, stayed in Greece for 7 years after completing his primary and secondary education. He moved to Turkey in 1948 and settled in İnegöl district. He worked as a civil servant in the Tekel administration, and then went into business for himself.

He was the President of the Bursa Chamber of Commerce and Industry, the Chairman of the Union of Chambers Council, the Chairman of the Sönmez Holding Board of Directors, and the 20th Term Deputy for Bursa.

Sönmez died on October 12, 2001 and was buried in Amir Sultan Cemetery in Bursa.

== Ali Osman Sönmez Foundation ==
Ali Osman Sönmez Foundation is a foundation founded by industrialist businessman Ali Osman Sönmez. The Foundation only gives scholarships to students studying in the field of business administration. Scholarship candidates must be from Bursa or have completed their secondary education in Bursa.
