= Hüseyin Sungur =

Turkish politician and merchant (1931–2022)

MP Hüseyin Sungur

Member of the Grand National Assembly
- In office 24 October 1973 – 5 June 1977
- Constituency: Bursa

Chairman of the Board of BCCI
- In office 1969–1972
- Preceded by: Abdi Biçen
- Succeeded by: Selahattin Aktar

Personal details
- Born: 1931 Bursa, Turkey
- Died: 21 August 2022 (aged 91–92)
- Citizenship: Turkish
- Party: Justice Party (Turkey)
- Education: Art Institute
- Occupation: Politician, merchant

Hüseyin Suat Sungur (1931 – 21 August 2022) was a Turkish merchant and politician.

Sungur was born in 1931 in Bursa. He graduated from Art Institute. After graduating from the institute, he started his business life. He established Bursa Çimento in 1966 with his friends. He served as the chairman of the board of directors of Bursa Chamber of Commerce and Industry between 1969 and 1972. Also, he was a member of Justice Party. He served as 15th term Grand National Assembly of Turkey Bursa deputy. He ended his political career after 1980. He died on 21 August 2022.
