= Olcay Kılavuz =

Turkish politician (born 1985)

Olcay Kılavuz (born 18 October 1985) is a Turkish politician. He was the chairman of the Grey Wolves between 2012 and 2018, and was elected as a Mersin deputy from the Nationalist Movement Party in the 2018 Turkish general election.

== Early years and education ==
Kılavuz was born on 18 October 1985, in the Azatlı town of Çiftlik District of Niğde Province. He completed his primary and secondary school education in Niğde and high school education in Faik Şahenk Anatolian Technical High School. He graduated from Niğde Ömer Halisdemir University's Department of Construction Technology and Department of Sports Management in 2015. In 2017, he received his master's degree from Düzce University.

== Political career ==
Kılavuz was appointed as the Chairman of the Grey Wolves on 9 December 2012. In the 2018 Turkish general elections, he was elected as Mersin Deputy from the MHP. At the same time, he became the first person to be both the chairman and deputy of Grey Wolves. He left his position as the Chairman of Grey Wolves on 31 December 2018. He was nominated in first place in the 2018 election, while he was nominated in fourth place for the 2023 elections and could not be elected.

In 2020, he punched Özgür Özel in the Grand National Assembly of Turkey. Later, he apologized to Özel. In 2023, Tolgahan Demirbaş, the suspected killer of Sinan Ateş, was detained from Kılavuz's house, sparking theories about Kılavuz's involvement in the murder.
