= Hayri Terzioğlu =

- Born: Hayri Terzioğlu
- Citizenship: Turkey
- Education: French School
- Occupations: Industrialist, journalist, politician
- Political party: Democrat Party (Turkey, 1946–1961)

Hayri Terzioğlu (1908, Bursa, 1976, Bursa), was a Turkish industrialist, journalist and politician. Terzioğlu, who served as BTSO President for 6 years, also took office in TOBB.

== Personal life and career ==
He was born in 1908 in Bursa. He completed primary school in Bursa. He finished high school at the French School. After graduation, he worked as a civil servant at İşbank.

In 1934, he started to manage the Terzioğlu Farm. He joined the Democrat Party in 1946 and became Bursa Provincial President in 1950. He held this post for 10 years.

In 1946, he bought the opposition newspaper Doğru and published it under the name of Hakimiyet. This newspaper was the only representative of the local press in Bursa. Between 1954 and 1960, he was the chairman of the Board of Bursa Chamber of Commerce and Industry. Terzioğlu, who also served as the first and second chairman in the Union of Chambers and Commodity Exchanges of Turkey, served as the chairman of the board of directors during the establishment of Bursa Çimento in 1966.

He was the chairman of Bursaspor in the 1967–1968 season.

== Death ==
He committed suicide in the Çelik Palas Hotel in Bursa in 1976.
