= Fahri Batıca =

Mayor of Bursa
- Preceded by: Edip Rüştü Akyürek
- Succeeded by: Ferit Akçor

Personal details
- Born: 1906 Beypazarı
- Died: 1973 (aged 66–67) Bursa
- Party: Republican People's Party
- Profession: Trader, industrialist, business person, politician

Fahri Batıca (1906, Beypazarı – 1973, Bursa) was a Turkish trader, industrialist and politician.

He dealt with the cocoon, silk, silk-fabric weaving and coal trade in Bursa. He was the Mayor of Bursa between 1946 and 1950.

== Life and career ==
He was born in 1906 in Beypazarı. After completing his secondary education in Ankara, he attended Ziraat Bank courses. After working at Ziraat Bank Adapazarı branch for a while, he continued his business life as an accountant at Adapazarı Security Fund. He established the Bursa branch of the fund.

In 1935 he quit accounting and started to work as a sericulture. Batıca, who also took part in the management staff of the CHP, was elected as the Mayor of Bursa in 1946. He served as mayor until 1950.

He was the president of Acar İdman Yurdu. He founded Bursa Rotary Club.

He died in Bursa in 1973.
