= Edip Rüştü Akyürek =

Turkish politician

Grand National Assembly of Turkey Bursa Deputy

Mayor of Bursa

Personal details
- Born: Edip Rüştü; 1903; Chios
- Died: 23 September 1974
- Occupation: Politician

Edip Rüştü Akyürek (1903–1974), is a Turkish politician who served as a member of parliament and mayor of Bursa.

== Early years and professional life ==
Edip Rüştü, who was born on the island of Chios in 1903, graduated from Istanbul University Faculty of Medicine, Department of Dentistry and started working as a dentist. He practiced his profession both at Balyakara Aydın Mining Company and as a freelancer.

== Political career ==
=== Mayor of Bursa ===
Akyürek was elected as the Mayor of Bursa on May 3, 1942. During this period, his works for culture and art in Bursa include opening the Municipal Music House and Art Gallery, as well as expropriating land for Kültürpark. In 1943, he corresponded with Muhsin Ertuğrul to establish a city theater affiliated with the municipality. According to his memoirs, although they agreed for Ertuğrul to come to Bursa three times a week, the municipal council did not allow the establishment of the theatre.

He also carried out studies on public health during his term as mayor. Due to the typhus epidemic that broke out in Istanbul in 1943, he intervened to prevent the disease from spreading to Bursa, which received a high number of visitors during this period. In this context, measures such as disinfecting buses coming from Istanbul, detecting fever patients and quarantining neighborhoods were put into effect.

== Bibliyografya ==
- Çakmak, Fevzi (2012). "Bursa yerelinde Cumhuriyet Halk Partisi (1946–1960)" (Doktora tezi). Bursa: Uludağ Üniversitesi. Archived from the original on 16 June 2023.
