= Ziya Uğur =

Turkish politician

Yusuf Ziya Uğur (born 1920) is a Turkish politician. He was born in Fatsa, Ordu.

He is a graduate of Istanbul University Faculty of Literature. He is engaged in trade. He served as Bursa Deputy for the 12th Term of the Grand National Assembly of Turkey. He is married and has three children.
