= Cumhuriyet Caddesi =

Street in Bursa, Turkey

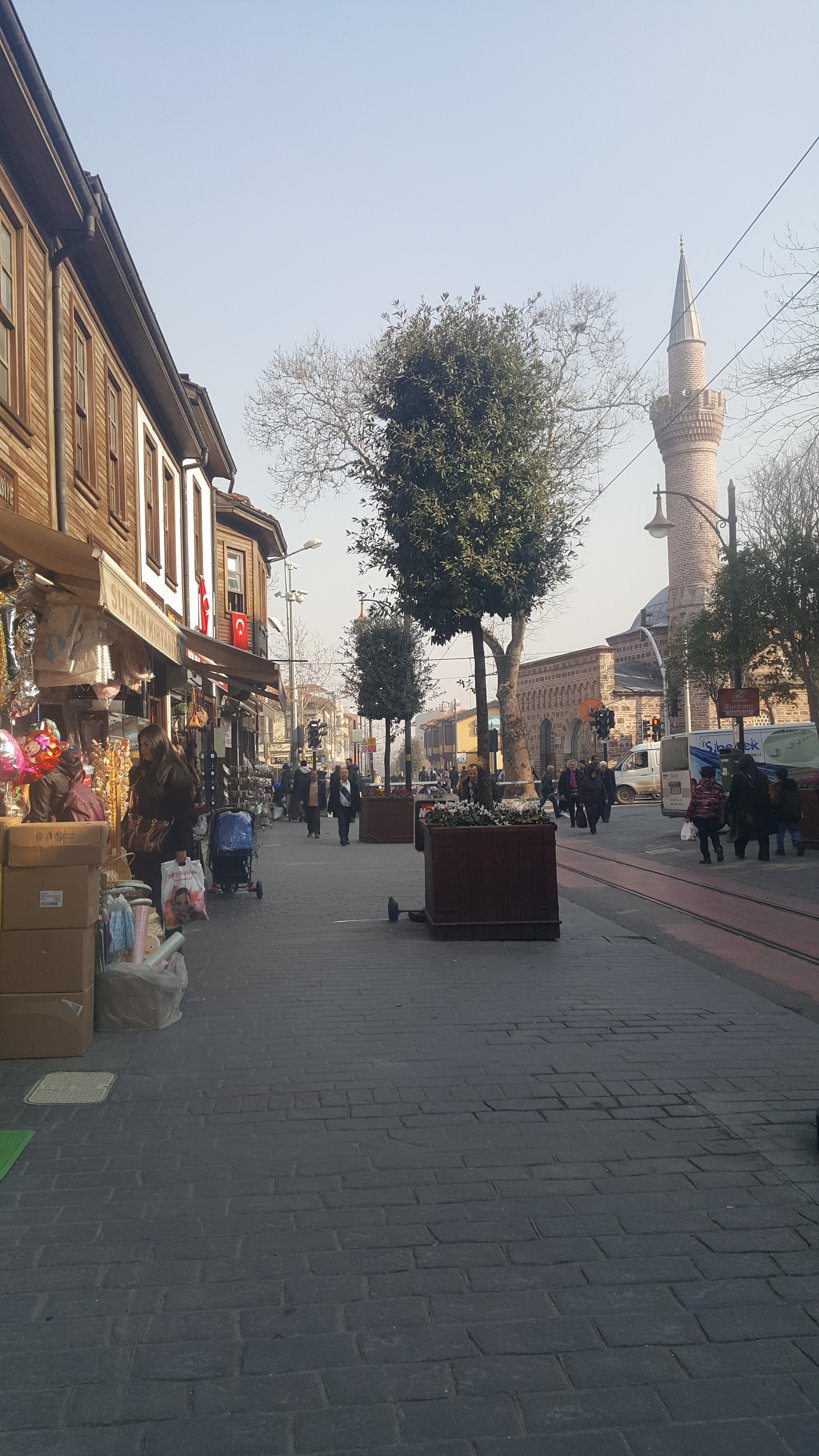
- Length: 1,50 km
- Location: Bursa

Cumhuriyet Caddesi is a street that starts at Zafer Square in the city center of Bursa and ends at Gökdere Boulevard.

It is located in the middle of Bursa's historical inns and bazaars. The street, which was opened in 1906 under the name "Hamidiye", was closed to vehicle traffic in 2004. Transportation on the street is maintained by a tram line in east–west direction, which was built in 2011 and called the "nostalgic tram line".

Cumhuriyet Street, which has come to the fore with its social function rather than its commercial function after it was closed to vehicle traffic, is still one of the important streets of Bursa in the field of curtains and decoration. On the street, there are 270 shops selling glassware, carpets and curtains.

== History ==
The street was built during the governorship of Mahmut Reşid Pasha. It was a street on which structures such as Tahil Han and Persembe Bath were located. After the proclamation of the II. Constitutional Monarchy, "Meşrutiyet Caddesi" was named and "Cumhuriyet Caddesi" in 1926.

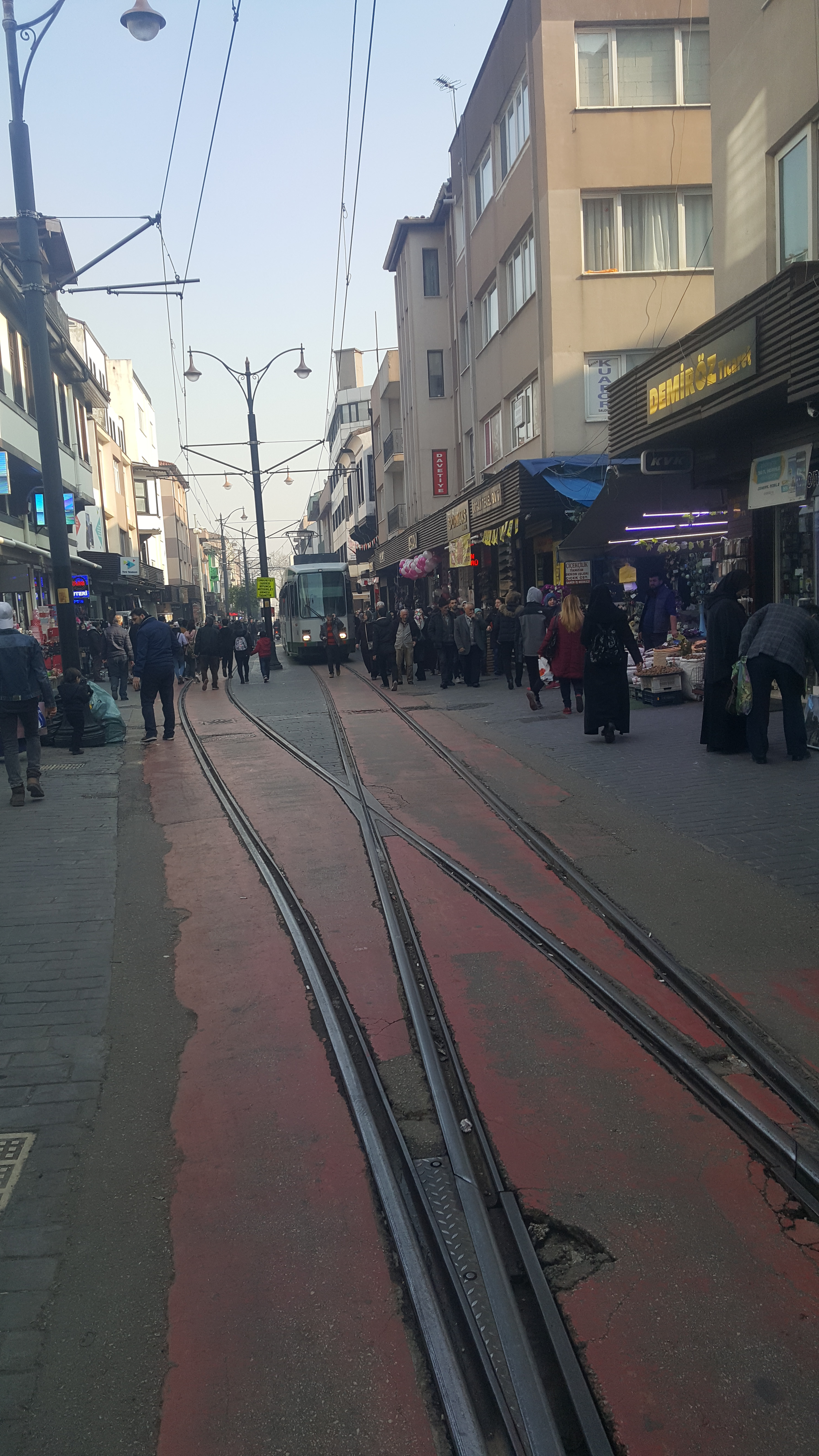
Tram line on the street

In line with the new planning made for Bursa bazaars after 2004, it was closed to vehicle traffic and turned into a street used only by pedestrians. Removal of air conditioners and advertising signs on the facades of buildings on the street within the scope of restoration and reconstruction works; Various interventions were made, such as replacing heat-insulated windows and joinery.

The tram line, which was built in 2011 to continue the transportation on the street; then it was extended to Davutkadı Neighborhood. The 2.4 km long tram line has 5 stops. The catenary poles built for the energy supply of the tram are also used for lighting purposes. Since catenary poles are also made suitable for painting and photography exhibitions; The street can function as an art gallery in a way.
