= Burhan Kuzu =

Turkish academic and politician (1955–2020)

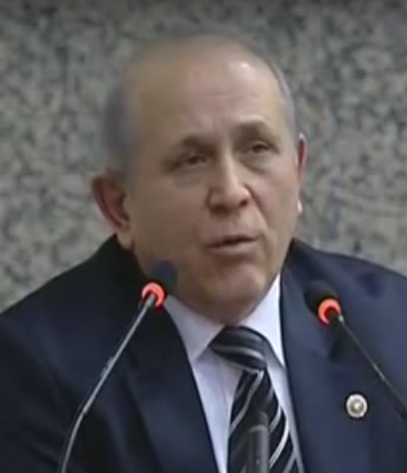
- Burhan Kuzu in December 2011

Member of the Grand National Assembly
- In office 1 November 2015 – 24 June 2018
- Constituency: Istanbul (November 2015)
- In office 3 November 2002 – 7 June 2015
- Constituency: Istanbul (2002); Istanbul (2007); Istanbul (2011)

Personal details
- Born: 1 January 1955 Develi, Turkey
- Died: 1 November 2020 (aged 65) Istanbul, Turkey
- Cause of death: COVID-19
- Resting place: Edirnekapı Martyr's Cemetery
- Party: Justice and Development Party
- Children: 2
- Education: Law
- Alma mater: Istanbul University
- Profession: Academic, politician

Burhan Kuzu (1 January 1955 – 1 November 2020) was a Turkish politician of the Justice and Development Party who served as a member of the Grand National Assembly of Turkey for Istanbul in the 22nd to 24th and 26th parliaments.

== Early life ==
Burhan Kuzu was born to Ali Rıza Kuzu and his wife Cahide at Şıhlı village of Develi district in Kayseri Province on 1 January 1955. The family had nine children. His father, a farmer and village imam died when he was in the primary school, and his mother died when he was in the junior high school.

During his high school years, he was interested in theatre. He studied law at Istanbul University.

After graduation, he took exams for the profession of judge and district governor. He started an internship for district governor in Tekirdağ Province. He preferred a career as an academic when he received an assistant post at the university in 1976. He earned his Master of Laws and Doctor of Law titles from Faculty of Law at Istanbul University. His field of study was Constitutional law. Between 1980 and 1982, he conducted research at Faculty of Law in Paris-Sorbonne University upon a scholarship given by the European Council.

== Academic career ==
In 1996, Kuzu was appointed full professor of the Chair of Constitutional Law at Faculty of Law in Istanbul University. He published papers and books in the field of law. He taught law at the Police College. He was also an academic member of the Faculty of Social Science at Beykent University in Istanbul. He was a guest professor at Zirve University in Gaziantep.

== Politician career ==
Kuzu entered politics as a co-founder of the Justice and Development Party (AK Party) in 2001. He served as the first chairman of the party's arbitration committee for democracy. At the 2002 general election, he won a seat in the Grand National Assembly of Turkey as a deputy of Istanbul from the AK Party. He kept his seat in the parliament at the 2007 and 2011 general elections. The rule of his party not allowing a parliament membership for more than three terms prevented him from running at the June 2015 general election. Kuzu entered the parliament again after the November 2015 general election. He served as the president of the Constitutional Commission in the parliament and as such was a vocal opposer of education in the Kurdish language.

In May 2016, Kuzu, threatened that Turkey would send refugees to Europe if the European Parliament made a "wrong decision" regarding visa-free travel for Turkish citizens.

== Private life and death ==
Kuzu was married with two children. He died on 1 November 2020, at age 65, from COVID-19 at Medipol Mega University Hospital where he was treated for nearly two weeks. He was interred at Edirnekapı Martyr's Cemetery following the religious funeral service held at Fatih Mosque.
