= Edirnekapı Martyr's Cemetery =

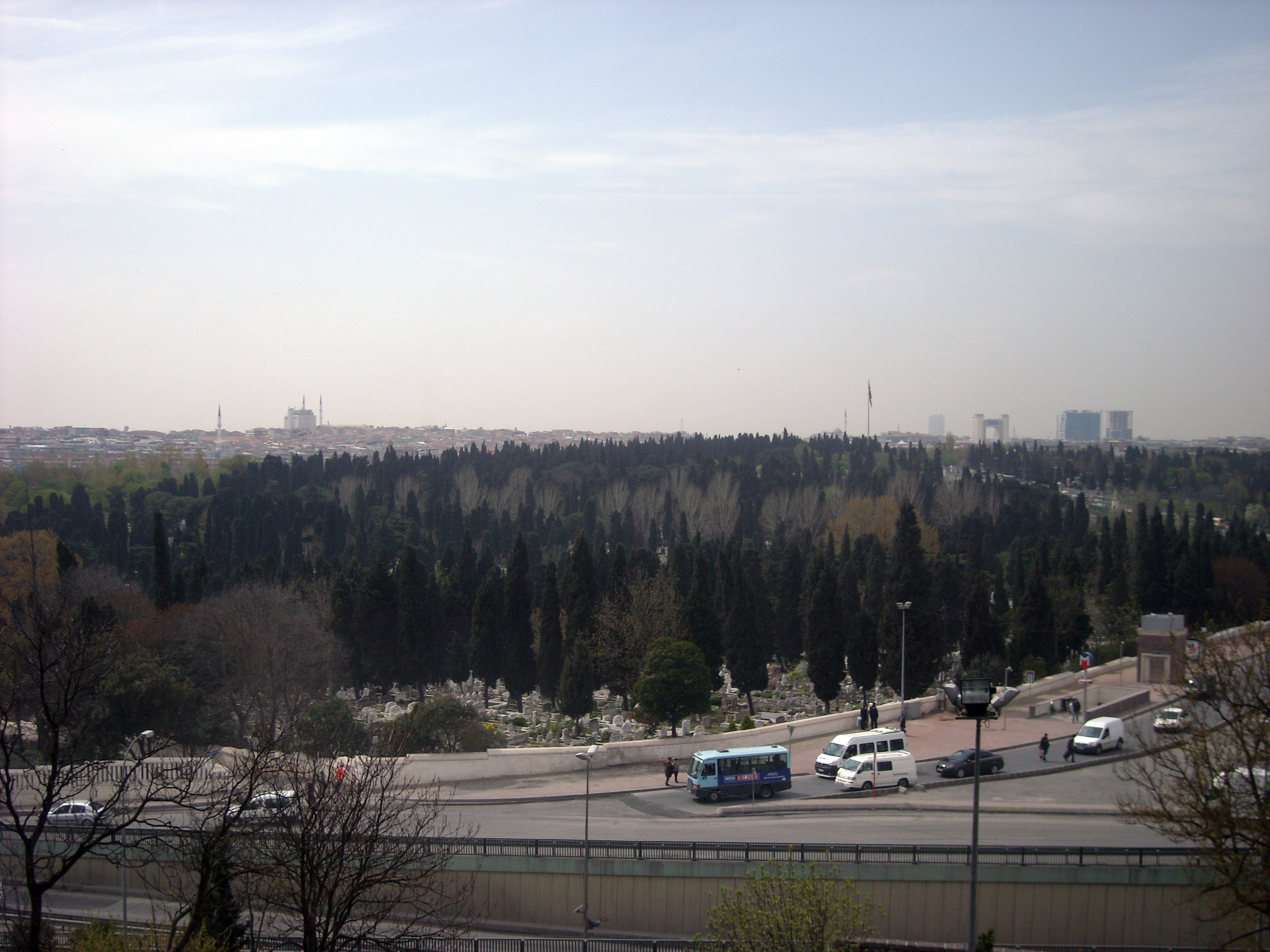
- Edirnekapı Martyr's Cemetery
- Interactive map of Edirnekapı Martyr's Cemetery

Details
- Established: 1453 (?)
- Location: Edirnekapı, Istanbul
- Country: Turkey
- Coordinates: 41°02′1.68″N 28°55′58.80″E
- Owned by: Türk Şehitlikleri İmar Vakfı
- Website: Türk Şehitlikleri İmar Vakfı website

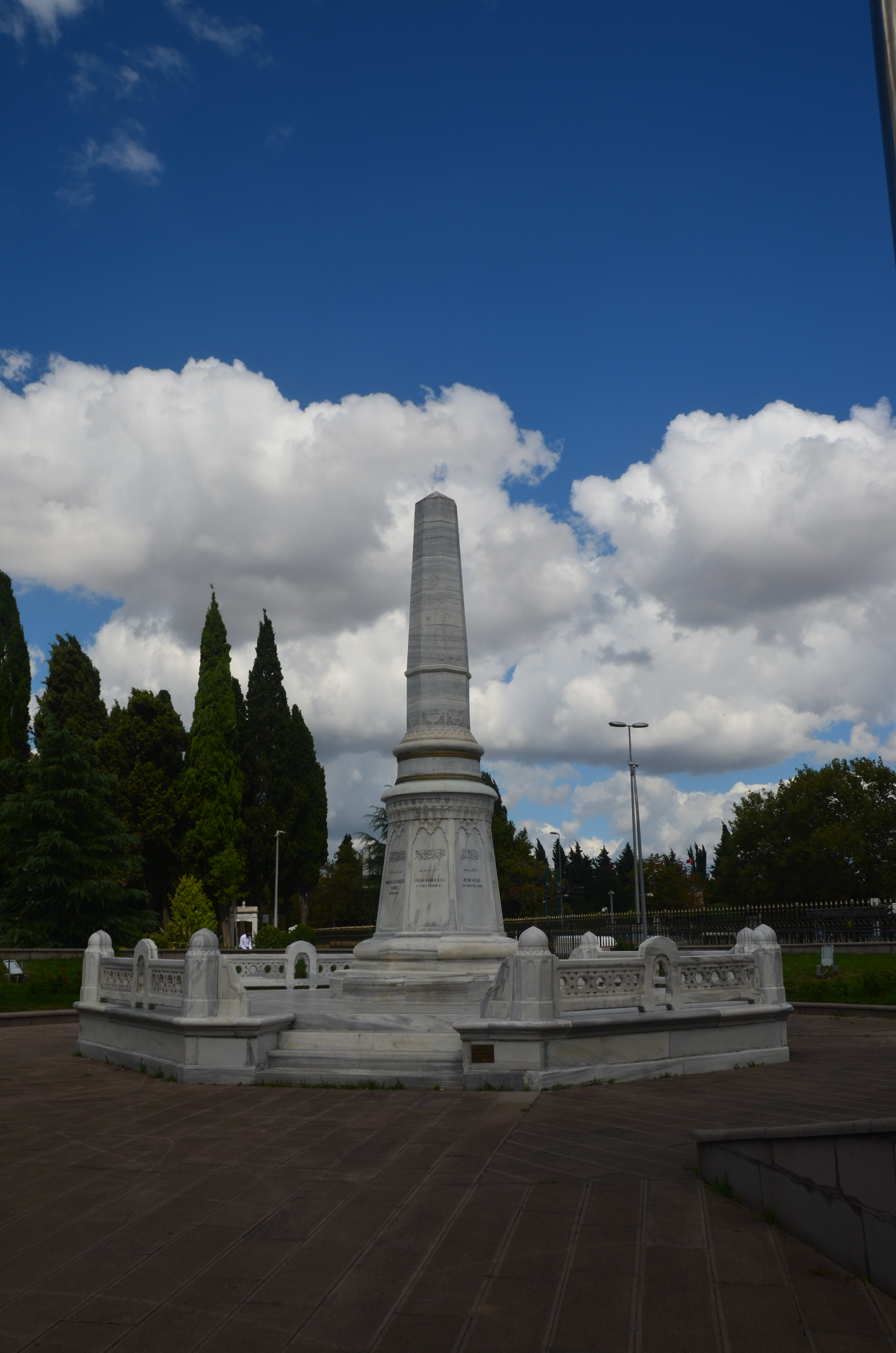
The Monument of World War I Martyrs (Turkish: Harb-i Umumi Şehitler Abidesi), to commemorate the fallen Ottoman soldiers at the Gallipoli campaign, naugurated on August 30, 1926, at the entrance of the cemetery.

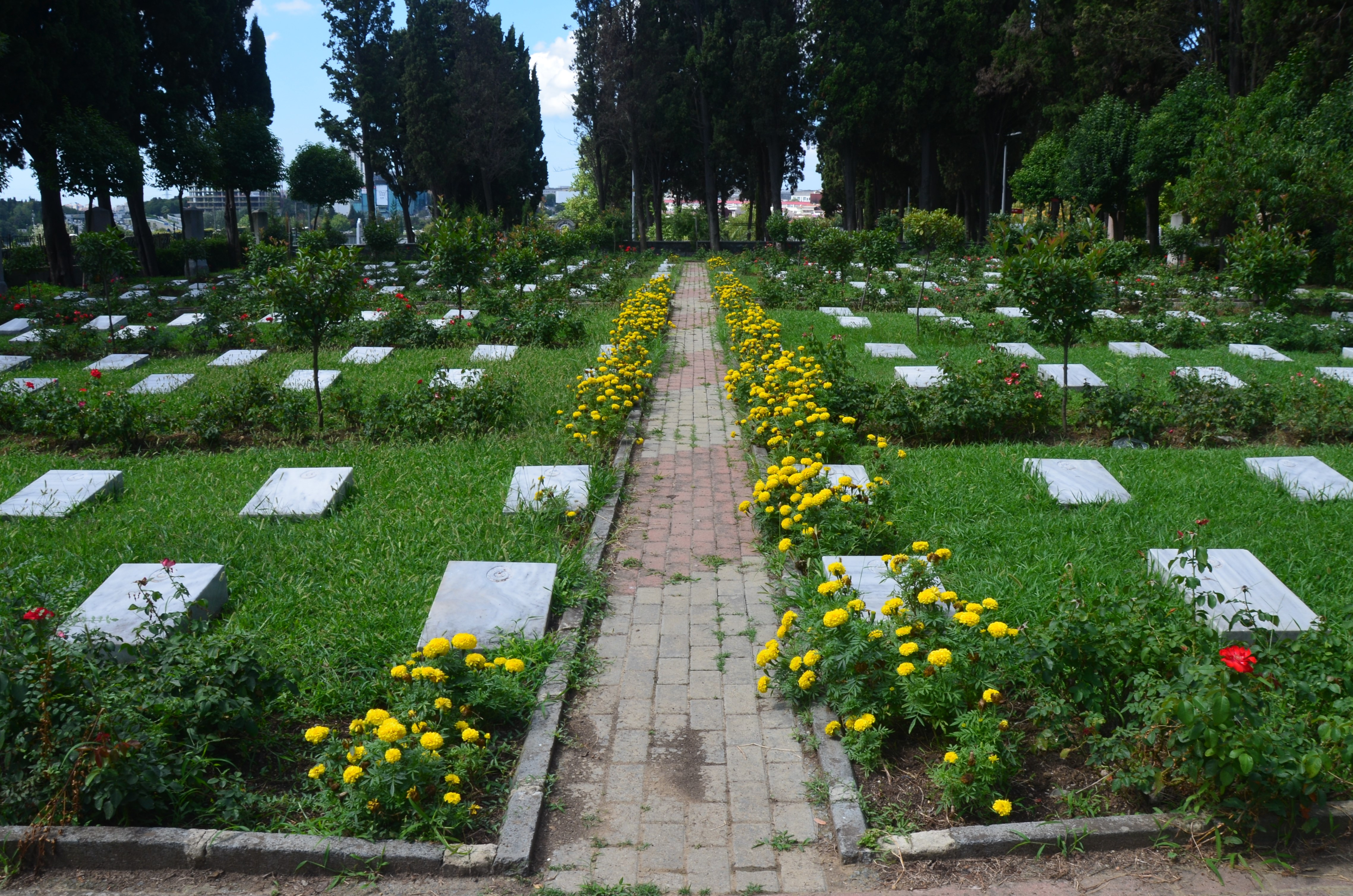
Symbolic empty graves of Ottoman soldiers fallen during the Gallipoli campaign of World War I.

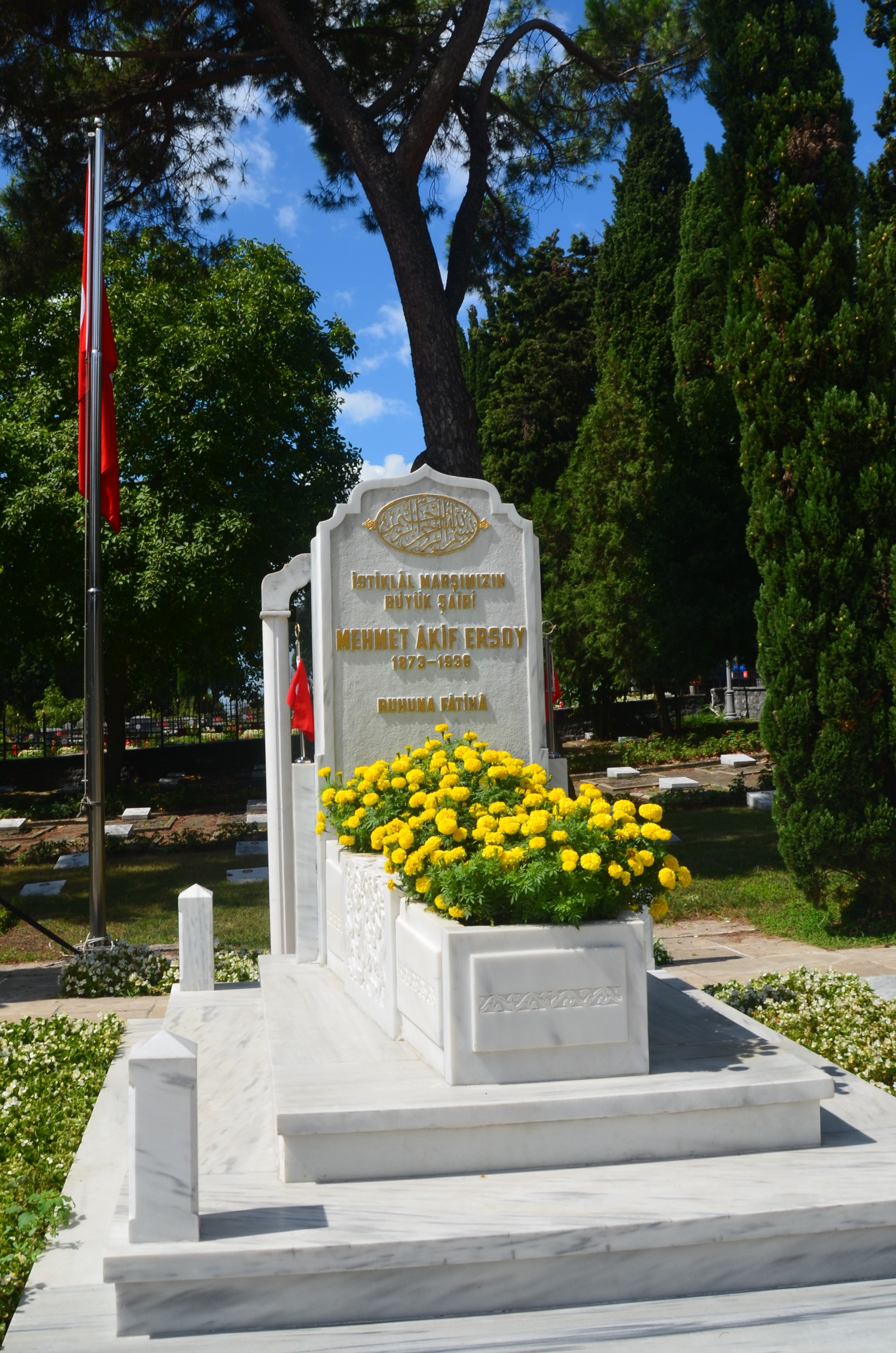
Grave of Mehmet Akif Ersoy, the author of the Turkish National Anthem.

The Edirnekapı Martyr's Cemetery (Turkish: Edirnekapı Şehitliği), one of the largest burial grounds of Istanbul, Turkey, is located in the neighborhood of Edirnekapı of Eyüp district, in the European part of the city. It consists of an old, historical part and a modern one. War graves of fallen Ottoman soldiers during the Balkan Wars, the Gallipoli campaign of World War I, graves of the Turkish Armed Forces military personnel and law enforcement officials, firefighters, Turkish Airlines personnel are part of the cemetery.

== History ==
The cemetery is said originally to have been formed with the graves of the Ottoman soldiers, who fell in the battle during the Second Ottoman Siege and Fall of Constantinople in 1453, where the last Byzantine emperor Constantine XI established his command and the Ottoman sultan Mehmed II made his triumphal entry into the conquered city. There is however no historical or archaeological evidence for this, the oldest known graves date from ca. 1600 AD. The cemetery is situated outside Edirnekapı (literally: Edirne Gate), historically the Gate of Charisius of the city walls, on top of the sixth hill of the old city.

The old part of the cemetery, including an area called "Mısır Tarlası" (literally: Corn Field), hosts graves of personalities from the 16th to the early 20th centuries. The other part of the cemetery consists of two grounds, Edirnekapı Cemetery and Sakızağacı Cemetery. Soldiers, who fought and were wounded in the Russo-Turkish Wars, Balkan Wars and the World War I, and died in Istanbul after hospitalization, were interred in Edirnekapı Cemetery. The General Command of Mapping denotes the number of such historical graves with around 13,000.

Military personnel of the Turkish Army, Navy and Air Force, personnel of the police force, firefighters and Turkish Airlines have all separate sections in the cemetery.

== Notable burials ==
Listed alphabetically:

In the historic part

- Bâkî (died 1600), poet
- Buhurizade Itri (died 1711), composer

In the modern part

- Mehmet Cemaleddin Efendi (1848–1917), Ottoman judge and Sheyhulisam
- Yunus Nadi Abalıoğlu (1878–1945), journalist
- Yusuf Akçura (1876–1935), Pan-Turkist activist
- Oğuz Atay (1934–1977), author
- Mehmet Akif Ersoy (1873–1936), poet
- Burhan Kuzu (1955–2020), academic and politician
- Süleyman Nazif (1870–1927), poet
- Recep Peker (1889–1950), prime minister
- Ruhi Sarıalp (1924–2001), Olympic medalist track and field athlete
- Leyla Saz (1850–1936), female composer
- Naim Süleymanoğlu (1967–2017), multiple world and Olympic champion weightlifter
- Bruno Taut (1880–1938), German architect (the only non-Muslim)
- Vedat Tek (1873–1942), architect
- Ahmed Tevfik Pasha (1845–1936), last Grand Vizier of the Ottoman Empire
- Cengiz Topel (1934–1964), fighter pilot
- Suat Hayri Ürgüplü (1903–1981), prime minister
- Haldun Dormen (1928–2026), actor and film director

== Gallery ==
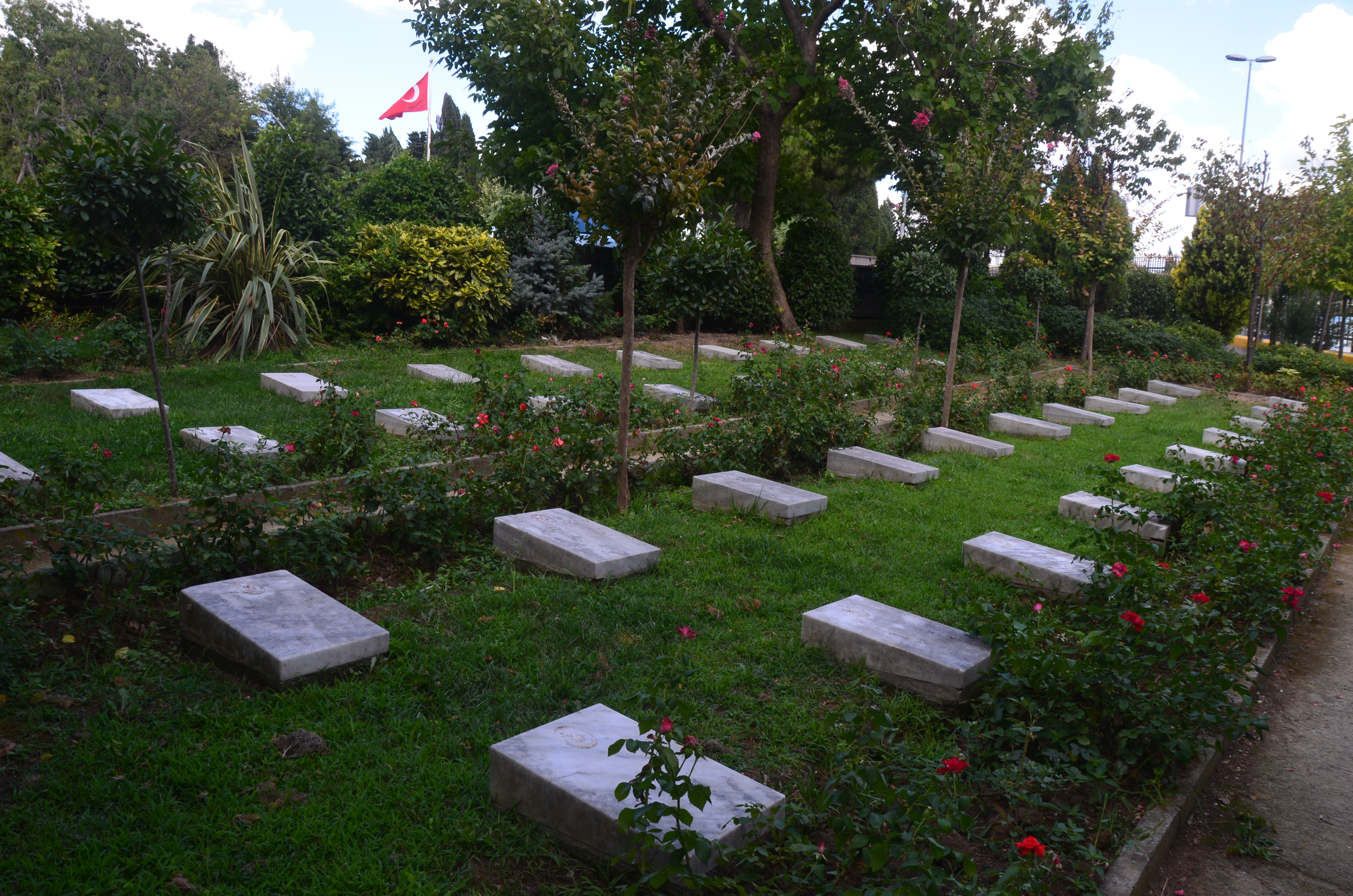
Symbolic empty war graves of Gallipoli campaign

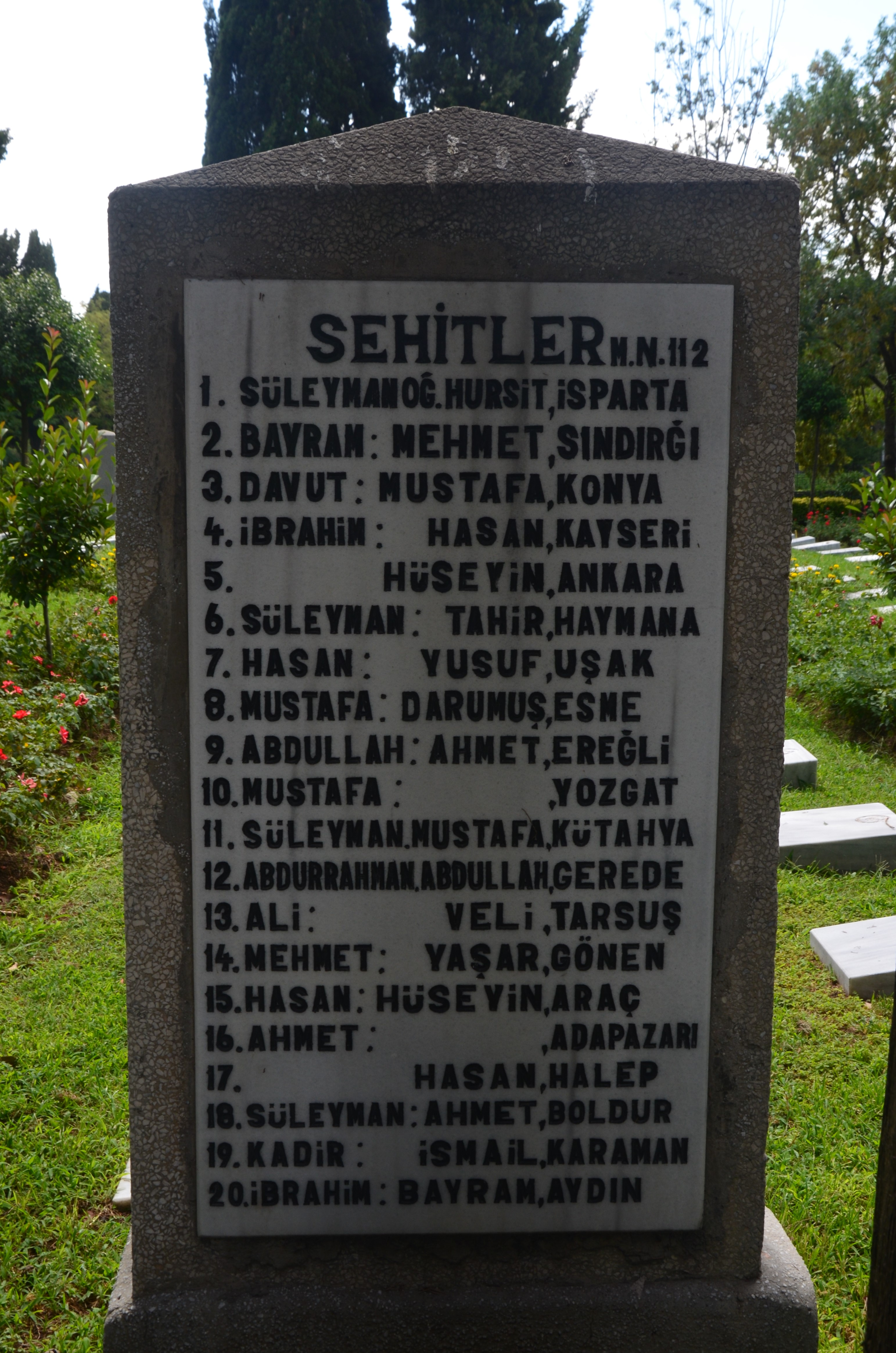
Name board of fallen soldiers in front of a grave row

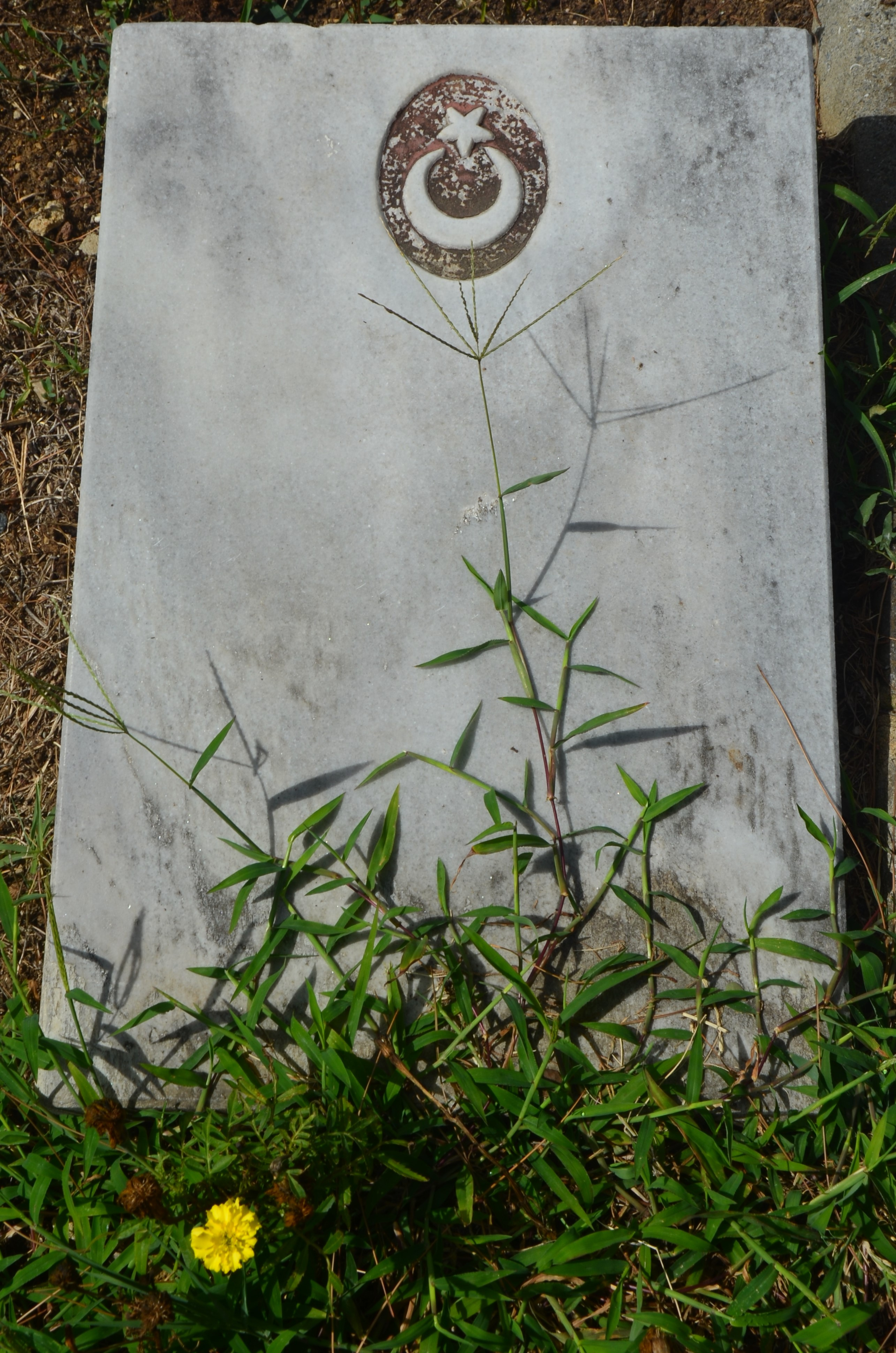
A symbolic empty grave of a fallen soldier
