= Ibrahim al-Halabi =

15th–16th century Muslim jurist (faqīh)

Ibrāhīm al-Ḥalabī

Personal life
- Born: 1460 Aleppo, Mamluk Sultanate
- Died: 1549 (aged 88–89) Istanbul, Ottoman Empire
- Notable work: Multaqā al-Abḥur

Religious life
- Religion: Islam
- Denomination: Sunnī
- Jurisprudence: Ḥanafī
- Creed: Māturīdī
- Arabic name
- Personal (Ism): Ibrāhīm
- Patronymic (Nasab): ibn Muḥammad ibn Ibrāhīm
- Toponymic (Nisba): al-Ḥalabī

Burhān ad-Dīn Ibrāhīm ibn Muḥammad ibn Ibrāhīm al-Ḥalabī (Arabic: برهان الدين ٳبراهيم بن محمد بن ٳبراهيم الحلبى) was an Islamic jurist (faqīh) who was born around 1460 in Aleppo, and who died in 1549 in Istanbul. His reputation as one of the most brilliant legists of his time chiefly rests on his work entitled Multaqā al-Abḥur, which became the standard handbook of the Ḥanafī school of Islamic law in the Ottoman Empire.

== Life ==
Not many details are known about the life of Ibrāhīm al-Ḥalabī, with the available contemporary sources offering only an outline of his career. All known facts are presented by Has (1981), virtually all of them found in a single source, the biographical dictionary al-Shaqā’iq al-Nu‛māniyya compiled by Ṭāshköpri-Zāda (d. 1561).

Al-Ḥalabī's nisba refers to his origin from Aleppo (in Arabic, Ḥalab), then part of the Mamluk Sultanate, where he was born around 1460. He received his initial education in the Islamic sciences in his hometown, and he also attended lectures in Damascus. This qualified him to work for some time as a prayer leader (imām) and orator (khaṭīb) in Aleppo.

In order to pursue his studies, late in the fifteenth century he moved to Cairo, the capital of the Mamluk Sultanate. In Cairo he probably attended lectures at the al-Azhar University, which offered a curriculum in Ḥanafī jurisprudence. He also studied with the famous scholar and prolific author Jalāl al-Dīn al-Suyūṭī (d. 1505), renowned for his studies on tafsīr and ḥadīth.

Around the year 1500, al-Ḥalabī moved to Istanbul, capital of the Ottoman Empire. His scholarly qualifications were apparently soon recognized, and he held the posts of imām and khaṭīb in various mosques, until he was finally appointed to the same posts in the prestigious Fātiḥ Mosque. He was also appointed as teacher in the new Dār al-Qurrā’ "House of Reciters" established by Shaykh al-Islām Sa‛dī Chelebī (d. 1539). It is in Istanbul that al-Ḥalabī wrote and published his most famous work, Multaqā al-Abḥur (ملتقى الأبحر).

Having lived the greater part of his life in Istanbul, and having attained a reputation among his contemporaries as one of the greatest jurists of the age, al-Ḥalabī died at the reported age of ninety in the year 1549. He is buried in the Edirnekapı neighbourhood of Istanbul.

The Austrian diplomat and historian Joseph von Hammer-Purgstall (1774–1856) includes al-Ḥalabī in his top ten of "profound legists" of the sixteenth century, the Ottoman golden age.

== Works ==
An extensively annotated list of al-Ḥalabī's writings is presented by Has. This list contains important additions and corrections to earlier lists, in particular the one provided by Brockelmann. Apart from Multaqā al-Abḥur (on which see the next sections), the other books and treatises known to have been written by al-Ḥalabī are listed below.

Two works of al-Ḥalabī gained wide currency as school primers, because of the simple Arabic in which they are written:

- Ghunyat al-Mutamallī, known in Turkish as Halebi-i Kebir "great Ḥalabī", a commentary on Munyat al-Muṣallī, a text on ritual prayer by Sadīd al-Dīn Muḥammad ibn Muḥammad al-Kāshgharī (d. 1305).
- Mukhtaṣar Ghunyat al-Mutamallī, an abridgement of the previous text, known in Turkish as Halebi-i Sağir "small Ḥalabī".

Three other book-length works probably originated as working notes made by al-Ḥalabī during his studies of Ḥanafī jurisprudence:

- al-Fawā’id al-Muntakhaba min al-Fatāwā al-Tātārkhāniyya, an anthology of fatwās selected from a larger, authoritative collection compiled by order of Khān-i A‛ẓam Tātārkhān, a nobleman at the court of Muḥammad Shāh II (r. 1325-1351) of the Ṭughlāq dynasty in northern India.
- Mukhtaṣar Fatḥ al-Qadīr, a summary of Fatḥ al-Qadīr by Muḥammad ibn ‛Abd al-Wāḥid Ibn al-Humām (d. 1457), a voluminous commentary on al-Marghīnānī's Hidāya, one of the sources of al-Ḥalabī's Multaqā.
- Mukhtaṣar al-Jawāhir al-Muḍiyya fī Ṭabaqāt al-Ḥanafiyya, an abridgement of a work by Abū Muḥammad ‛Abd al-Qādir ibn Abī al-Wafā’ (d. 1373) containing biographical and bibliographical information on the "classes" (ṭabaqāt) of scholars belonging to the Ḥanafī school.

Other, lesser known works are:

- Naẓm Sīrat al-Nabī wa-Sharḥuh, a versified biography of Muḥammad in 63 verses, with the author's own commentary.
- al-Ḥilya al-Sharīfa, on Muḥammad and his virtues, mainly based on the famous Kitāb al-Shifā’ by Qāḍī ‛Iyāḍ (d. 1149).
- Kitāb Fuṣūl al-Arba‛īn, a selection of traditions (ḥadīth) arranged in forty chapters, concerned with various aspects of Islamic ritual (attributed, authorship not certain).
- A commentary on an ode (qaṣīda) composed by Sharaf al-Dīn Ismā‛īl ibn Muqri’ al-Yamanī (d. 1433), a Shāfi‛ī scholar.

A notable aspect of al-Ḥalabī's conservative views is his opposition against the philosophy and works of Ibn ‛Arabī (d. 1240), the sufi mystic. This took the form of two of lengthy treatises containing hard criticisms of Ibn ‛Arabī's famous work Fuṣūṣ al-Ḥikam, and another treatise against extreme sufi practices such as dancing (raqṣ) and whirling (dawarān):

- Ni‛mat al-Dharī‛a fī Nuṣrat al-Sharī‛a.
- Tasfīh al-Ghabī fī Tanzīh Ibn ‛Arabī.
- al-Rahṣ wa-l-Waqṣ li-Mustaḥill al-Raqṣ.

More conventional treatises on arcane legal matters are:

- al-Qiyām ‛inda Dhikr Wilādat Rasūl Allāh, against the practise of standing up when the birth of Muḥammad is mentioned during the celebration of the mawlid.
- Risāla fī al-Masḥ ‛alā al-Khuffayn, on the lawfulness of the practice of rubbing footwear during ritual purification, a much debated issue at the time.
- Risāla fī al-Radd ‛alā man I‛taqada Islām Āzār, on the question of whether there were infidels among the ancestors of Muḥammad.
- Risāla fī Ḥaqq Abaway Nabiyyinā (‛alayh al-salām), on the question of whether any of the people who died before the mission of Muḥammad could be regarded as true believers.
- Risālat al-Himmaṣa, on the lawfulness of using a concoction of chick peas as a poultice.
- Risāla fī Tawjīh al-Tashbīh.
- Risāla fī Sharaf al-Qurashī Nabiyyinā.

The following works are among those which have been wrongly attributed to Ibrāhīm al-Ḥalabī:

- Silk al-Niẓām, by Ibrāhīm ibn Muṣṭafā al-Ḥalabī (d. 1776) a commentary on Jawāhir al-Kalām, a philosophical text by ‛Aḍud al-Dīn ‛Abd al-Raḥmān ibn Aḥmad al-Ījī (d. 1355).
- Durrat al-Muwaḥḥidīn wa-Dirrat al-Mulḥidīn by Ibrāhīm ibn Shaykh al-Islām Mūsā al-Ḥalabī, a pamphlet exhorting Sultan Bāyazīd II (r. 1481-1512) to take action against the persecution of Sunni Muslims under the Persian Safavids.
- Tuḥfat al-Akhyār by Ibrāhīm ibn Muṣṭafā al-Ḥalabī (d. 1776), a supercommentary on al-Ḥaṣkafī's (d. 1677) commentary al-Durr al-Mukhtār on Tanwīr al-Abṣār wa-Jāmi‛ al-Biḥār by al-Timirtāshī (d. 1595).
- Risāla fī Mas’alat al-Jabl min Awā’il Sharḥ Qāḍī-Zāda ‛alā Mulakhkhaṣ al-Jaghmīnī, a text composed in 1411 (i.e. before al-Ḥalabī's birth) by another, otherwise unidentified Ibrāhīm al-Ḥalabī. The text is a treatise on an issue brought up by Qāḍī-Zāda (d. 1412) in his commentary on the Mulakhkhaṣ of al-Jaghmīnī (d. 1212).

== The Multaqā ==
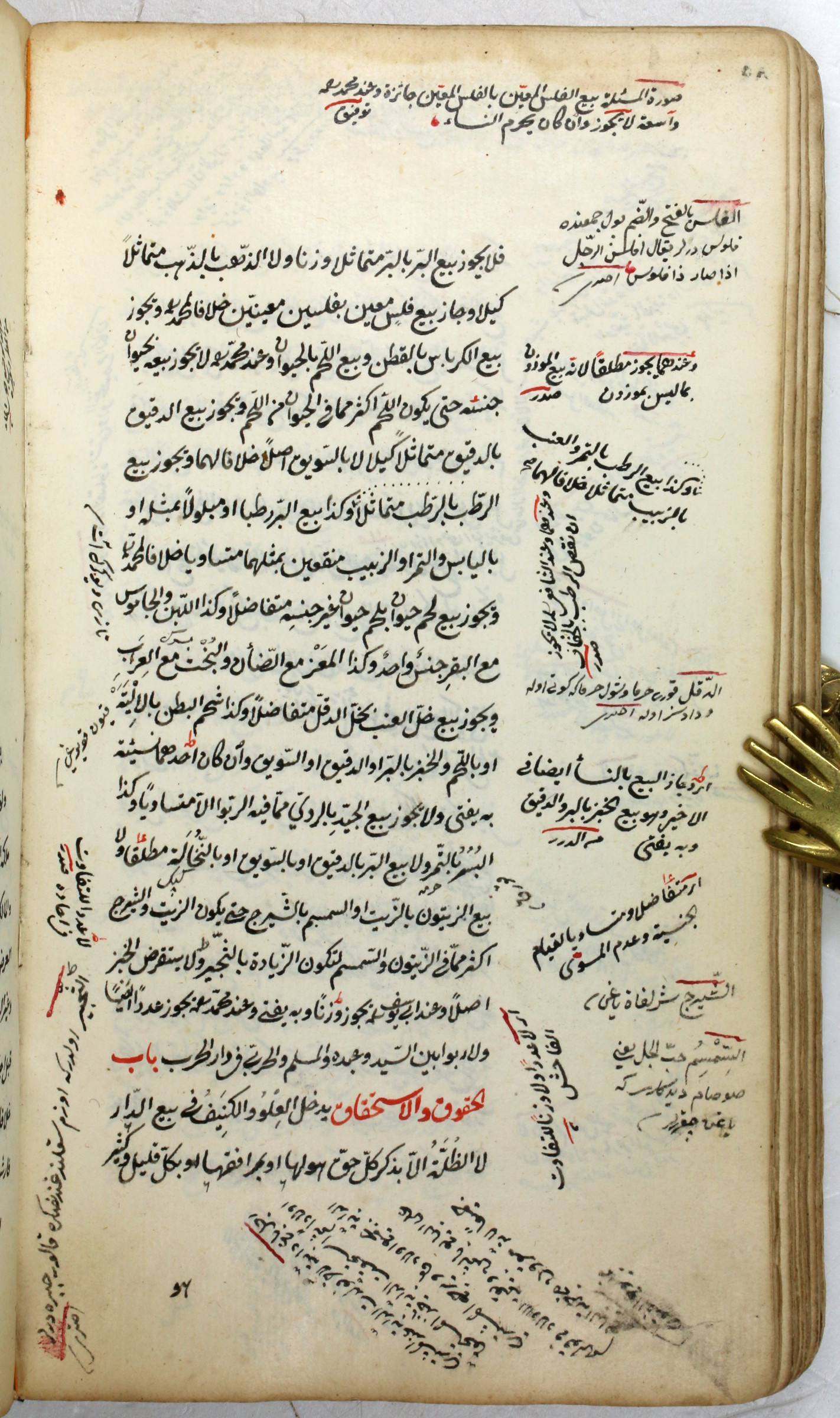
17th-century manuscript of al-Halabi's Multaqa al-Abhur

Al-Ḥalabī's most famous work is entitled Multaqā al-Abḥur "Confluence of the Seas", completed by the author on 23 Rajab 923 (11 September 1517). The work is a condensation of a number of earlier standard compilations of Ḥanafī jurisprudence (the "seas" of the title). The author neatly points out where these sources agree, and where they disagree, and provides guidance by indicating which legal opinions in his estimation are most correct (aṣaḥḥ), strongest (aqwā), or preferable (arjaḥ), and indicating which opinion is preferred in formal legal opinion (al-mukhtār li-l-fatwā).

Usually referred to as the Multaqā (in Turkish, Mülteka), the work is comprehensive yet concise, and written in a simple style. These qualities earned it a reputation as a convenient reference-book among judges, and made it a standard textbook in the Ottoman madrasas from the reign of sultan Süleyman I "the Magnificent" (r. 1520-1566), replacing al-Nasafī's Kanz al-Daqā’iq. The book would retain its pre-eminence for three centuries.

The popularity of the Multaqā can be gauged from the large number of commentaries written over the following centuries, and from the fact that the text was translated into Turkish. The canonical status of the Multaqā was also noted by several European observers, with Farley remarking that "The Sultan rules over the Turks, but the Koran and the Multeka rule over Sultan."

The Multaqā retained its importance right up to the very last years of the Ottoman Empire. The Mecelle, the Ottoman civil code promulgated in 1877, incorporates more passages translated directly from the Multaqā than from any other single source. Also, twelve printed editions of the text were produced in Istanbul between 1836 and 1898.

The German-British scholar Joseph Schacht used the Multaqā as the primary source for the systematic section in his seminal Introduction to Islamic law (1964). He describes the Multaqā as "one of the latest and most highly esteemed statements of the doctrine of the [Ḥanafī] school, which presents Islamic law in its final, fully developed form".

The contents of the Multaqā are arranged according to the conventional divisions of a Ḥanafī lawbook, with the main subjects treated in 57 books (kitāb, listed below), and with further subdivisions into chapters (bāb) and sections (faṣl).

Ch.	Title in Arabic	Subject
1	Kitāb al-Ṭahāra	ritual purity
2	Kitāb al-Ṣalāh	ritual prayer
3	Kitāb al-Zakāh	alms tax
4	Kitāb al-Ṣawm	fasting
5	Kitāb al-Ḥajj	pilgrimage to Mecca
6	Kitāb al-Nikāḥ	marriage
7	Kitāb al-Raḍā‛	fosterage
8	Kitāb al-Ṭalāq	repudiation
9	Kitāb al-I‛tāq	manumission of slaves
10	Kitāb al-Aymān	oaths
11	Kitāb al-Ḥudūd	the fixed punishments
12	Kitāb al-Sariqa	theft
13	Kitāb al-Siyar	the conduct of war
14	Kitāb al-Laqīṭ	foundlings
15	Kitāb al-Luqaṭa	found property
16	Kitāb al-Ābiq	runaway slaves
17	Kitāb al-Mafqūd	missing persons
18	Kitāb al-Sharika	partnership
19	Kitāb al-Waqf	religious endowments
20	Kitāb al-Buyū‛	sales
21	Kitāb al-Ṣarf	exchange
22	Kitāb al-Kafāla	suretyship
23	Kitāb al-Ḥawāla	transfer of debts
24	Kitāb al-Qaḍā’	administration of law
25	Kitāb al-Shahādāt	testimony
26	Kitāb al-Wakāla	procuration
27	Kitāb al-Da‛wā	claims
28	Kitāb al-Iqrār	acknowledgements
29	Kitāb al-Ṣulḥ	amicable settlements
30	Kitāb al-Muḍāraba	sleeping partnerships
31	Kitāb al-Wadī‛a	deposits
32	Kitāb al-‛Āriyya	loans
33	Kitāb al-Hiba	gifts
34	Kitāb al-Ijāra	hire and lease
35	Kitāb al-Mukātab	slaves who have concluded a contract of manumission
36	Kitāb al-Walā’	relationship of client and patron
37	Kitāb al-Ikrāh	duress
38	Kitāb al-Ḥajr	interdiction
39	Kitāb al-Ma’dhūn	slaves who have been given permission to trade
40	Kitāb al-Ghaṣb	usurpation
41	Kitāb al-Shuf‛a	pre-emption
42	Kitāb al-Qisma	division
43	Kitāb al-Muzāra‛a	lease of a field
44	Kitāb al-Musāqāt	lease of a plantation
45	Kitāb al-Dhabā’iḥ	ritual slaughter
46	Kitāb al-Uḍḥiyya	sacrifice
47	Kitāb al-Karāhiyya	reprehensibility
48	Kitāb Iḥyā’ al-Mawāt	cultivating of waste land
49	Kitāb al-Ashriba	unlawful drinks
50	Kitāb al-Ṣayd	hunting
51	Kitāb al-Rahn	pawning
52	Kitāb al-Jināyāt	crimes against persons
53	Kitāb al-Diyāt	blood money
54	Kitāb al-Ma‛āqil	blood money
55	Kitāb al-Waṣāyā	bequests
56	Kitāb al-Khunthā	hermaphrodites
57	Kitāb al-Farā’iḍ	inheritance

=== Sources ===
In his brief introduction to the Multaqā, the author mentions the four central texts on which his work is mainly based. He refers to these texts as al-kutub al-arba‛a "the four books"; in Ḥanafī tradition they are also known as al-mutūn al-arba‛a "the four texts". They are:

- al-Mukhtaṣar by Aḥmad ibn Muḥammad al-Qudūrī (d. 1037).
- al-Mukhtār li-l-Fatwā by Abū al-Faḍl Majd al-Dīn ‛Abd Allāh ibn Maḥmūd al-Mawṣilī (d. 1284).
- Kanz al-Daqā’iq fī al-Furū‛ by Ḥāfiẓ al-Dīn Abū al-Barakāt ‛Abd Allāh ibn Aḥmad al-Nasafī (d. 1310).
- Wiqāyat al-Riwāya fī Masā’il al-Hidāya by Burhān al-Dīn Maḥmūd ibn ‛Ubayd Allāh al-Maḥbūbī (d. 1312).

To the materials taken from these sources al-Ḥalabī added (in his words) "whatever is needed" and "a small portion" respectively from two other well-known Ḥanafī works:

- Majma‛ al-Baḥrayn wa-Multaqā al-Nayyirayn by Muẓaffar al-Dīn Aḥmad ibn ‛Alī al-Baghdādī, known as Ibn al-Sā‛ātī "son of the clockmaker" (d. 1294).
- al-Hidāya fī Sharḥ al-Bidāya by Burhān al-Dīn ‛Alī ibn Abī Bakr al-Marghīnānī (d. 1197).

These six sources are part of the vast and complex network of texts on Ḥanafī jurisprudence already existent at the time. The nature of the many intertextual relationships can be illustrated with al-Ḥalabī's sources: al-Qudūrī's Mukhtaṣar, as its title indicates, is a "synopsis" of earlier works; al-Mawṣilī's Mukhtār is an anthology of fatwās, mainly those of Abū Ḥanīfa (d. 767CE), the founder of the Ḥanafī school; al-Nasafī's Kanz is an abridgement of his own Kitāb al-Wāfī, which in turn is modelled on al-Marghinānī's Hidāya; al-Maḥbūbī's Wiqāya is excerpted from al-Marghīnānī's Hidāya, which in turn is a commentary on its author's own popular textbook Bidāyat al-Mubtadi’, which used Qudūrī's Mukhtaṣar as one of its two main sources; finally, the Majma‛ of Ibn al-Sā‛ātī is based on two sources, al-Qudūrī's Mukhtaṣar and the Manẓūma by Najm al-Dīn Abū Ḥafṣ ‛Umar al-Nasafī (d. 1068).

The prime characteristic of the Multaqā which gave the book its central place is its comprehensiveness. This made the book into a sort of "one stop shop" for judges, obviating the need for them to enter the thicket of existing, usually much more voluminous works, and thus saving them a lot of time and effort. It has to be borne in mind here that medieval books are generally not furnished with tables of contents, indexes or numbered chapters and sections.

=== Commentaries ===
Inevitably, having become the most popular handbook of Ḥanafī jurisprudence, al-Ḥalabī's work spawned its own plethora of commentaries, supercommentaries and glosses. More than fifty such works have been identified. The earliest commentary, by Sulaymān ibn ‛Alī al-Qaramānī (d. 1518) was completed within a year of the Multaqā's completion, but no copies of it seem to have survived. The earliest still extant commentary was composed in 1587, while the most recent commentary dates from 1862. The most widely consulted commentaries are:

- Majma‛ al-Anhur by ‛Abd al-Raḥmān ibn Muḥammad ibn Shaykh Sulaymān, known as Shaykh-Zāda (d. 1667).
- al-Durr al-Muntaqā by ‛Alā’ al-Dīn Muḥammad ibn ‛Alī al-Ḥaṣkafī (d. 1677).

=== Translations ===
During the reign of Sultan Ibrāhīm (r. 1640-1648), a Turkish translation was made of al-Ḥalabī's text with Shaykh-Zāda's commentary, and with added annotations. It is entitled Mevkufat, and was prepared by Muḥammad Mawqūfātī (Mevkufati Mehmed Efendi), by order of Grand Vizier Muṣṭafā Pasha. The first printed editions of this work appeared in Būlāq (1838) and Istanbul (1852), and modern printed editions of the Mevkufat, in Latin script, are still being published in Turkey. Several modern Turkish translations of the Multaqā, with fresh commentaries, are available as well.

In view of the central place which the Multaqā acquired in the Ottoman legal system, as noted at the time by European observers, it is a curious fact that no complete translation of it into a western European language was ever made. D'Ohsson (1788-1824, vol. 5-6) and Sauvaire (1882) offer a translation into French of only a few selected chapters. As Hammer-Purgstall remarked,

"a complete translation of [the Multaqā] will be perfectly adequate for a more thorough knowledge of Islamic civil legislation and Ottoman private law."

== See also ==
- Sharī‛a
- Madhhab
- Ḥanafī
- Fiqh
- Faqīh
- Fatwā
- Ottoman Empire

== Cited works ==
- Brockelmann, Carl (1937–1949). Geschichte der arabischen Litteratur. 2nd edition, vol. G I-II, S I-III, Leiden: Brill. ISBN 9789004230262.
- Davudoğlu, Ahmed (2013). Mevkufat: Mülteka Tercümesi. Istanbul: Sağlam Yayınevi. ISBN 9789759180812.
- Farley, James Lewis (1876). Turks and Christians. London: Simpkin, Marshall & Co.
- von Hammer, Joseph (1815). Des osmanischen Reichs Staatsverfassung und Staatsverwaltung. Wien: Camesinasche Buchhandlung.
- de Hammer, Joseph (1835–1843). Histoire de l'empire Ottoman. Vol. 1-18, Paris: Bellizard, Barthès, Dufour et Lowell.
- Has, Şükrü Selim (1981). A study of Ibrāhīm al-Ḥalabī with special reference to the Multaqā. Edinburgh University: PhD thesis.
- Has, Şükrü Selim (1988). "The use of Multaqā 'l-Abḥur in the Ottoman madrasas and in legal scholarship" (PDF). Osmanlı Araştırmaları. VII–VIII: 393–418. Archived from the original (PDF) on 2017-04-03.
- Khan, Aamir Shahzada (2014). Multaqā al-Abḥur of Ibrāhīm al-Ḥalabī (d. 1549): A Ḥanafī legal text in its sixteenth-century Ottoman context. Budapest Central European University: MA thesis.
- d'Ohsson, Ignatius Mouradgea (1788–1824). Tableau général de l'Empire Othoman. Vol. 1-7, Paris: Firmin Didot.
- Redhouse, James (1968). Redhouse Yeni Türkçe-İngilizce Sözlük. Istanbul: Redhouse Yayınevi.
- Sauvaire, Henry (1882). Droit musulman (rite hanafite). Le moultaqa el abheur avec commentaire abrégé du Majma' el anheur. Marseille: Académie des sciences, belles-lettres et arts.
- Schacht, Joseph (1964). An Introduction to Islamic law. Oxford: Clarendon. ISBN 9780198254737.
- Uysal, Mustafa (2000). İzahlı Mülteka el-Ebhur Tercümesi. Istanbul: Çelik Yayınevi. ISBN 9789756457917.
- Vanlıoğlu, Hüsameddin (2011). Mülteka Tercümesi. Istanbul: Yasin Yayınevi. ISBN 9786055719708.
