= Mihrimah Sultan Mosque, Edirnekapı =

16th century Turkish mosque

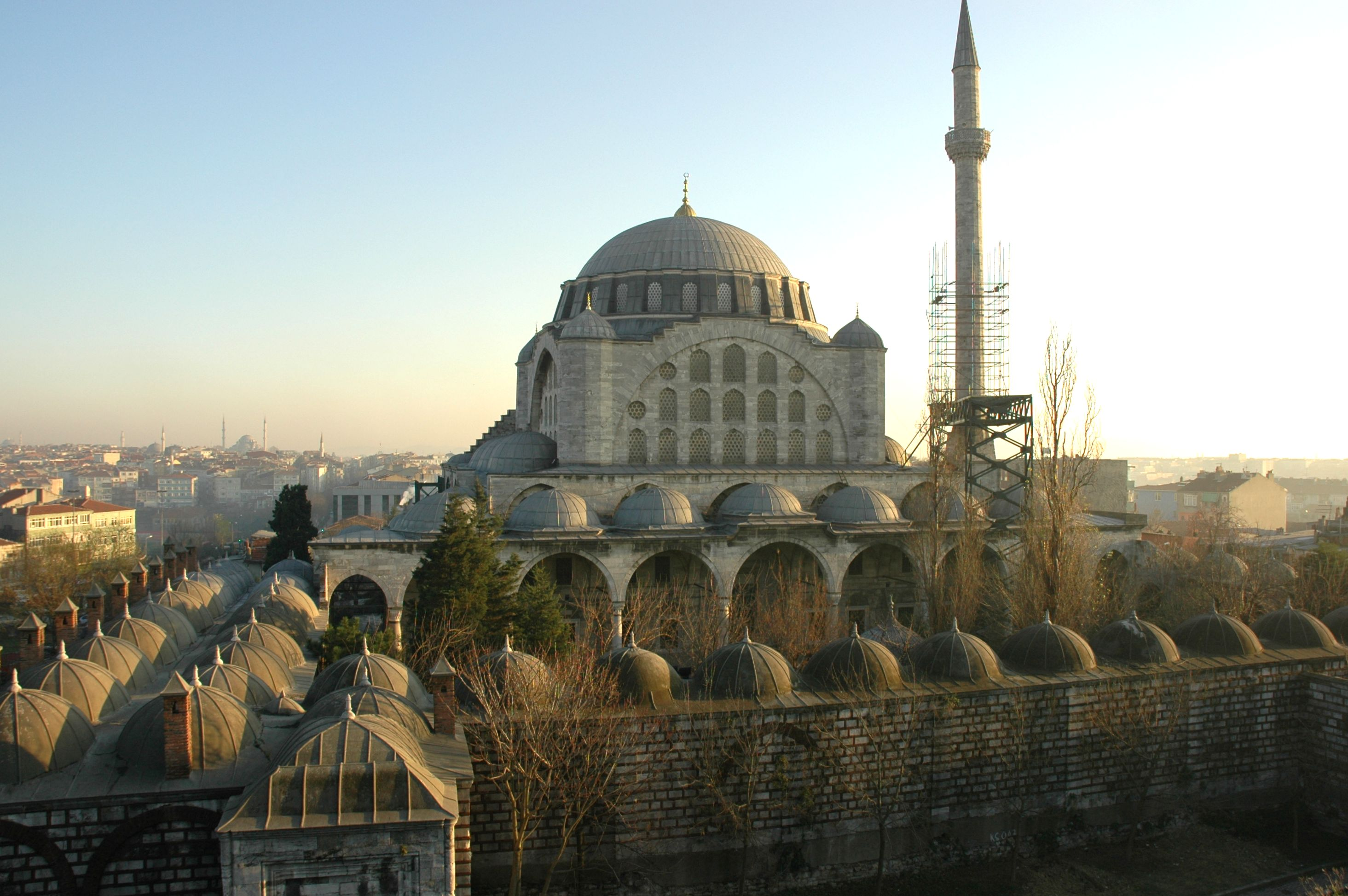

Location
- Interactive map of Mihrimah Sultan Mosque, Edirnekapı

Architecture
- Architect: Mimar Sinan
- Type: Mosque
- Groundbreaking: c. 1563
- Completed: c. 1570

Specifications
- Dome height (outer): 37 meters (121 ft)
- Dome dia. (outer): 20 meters (66 ft)
- Minaret: 1
- Materials: granite, marble

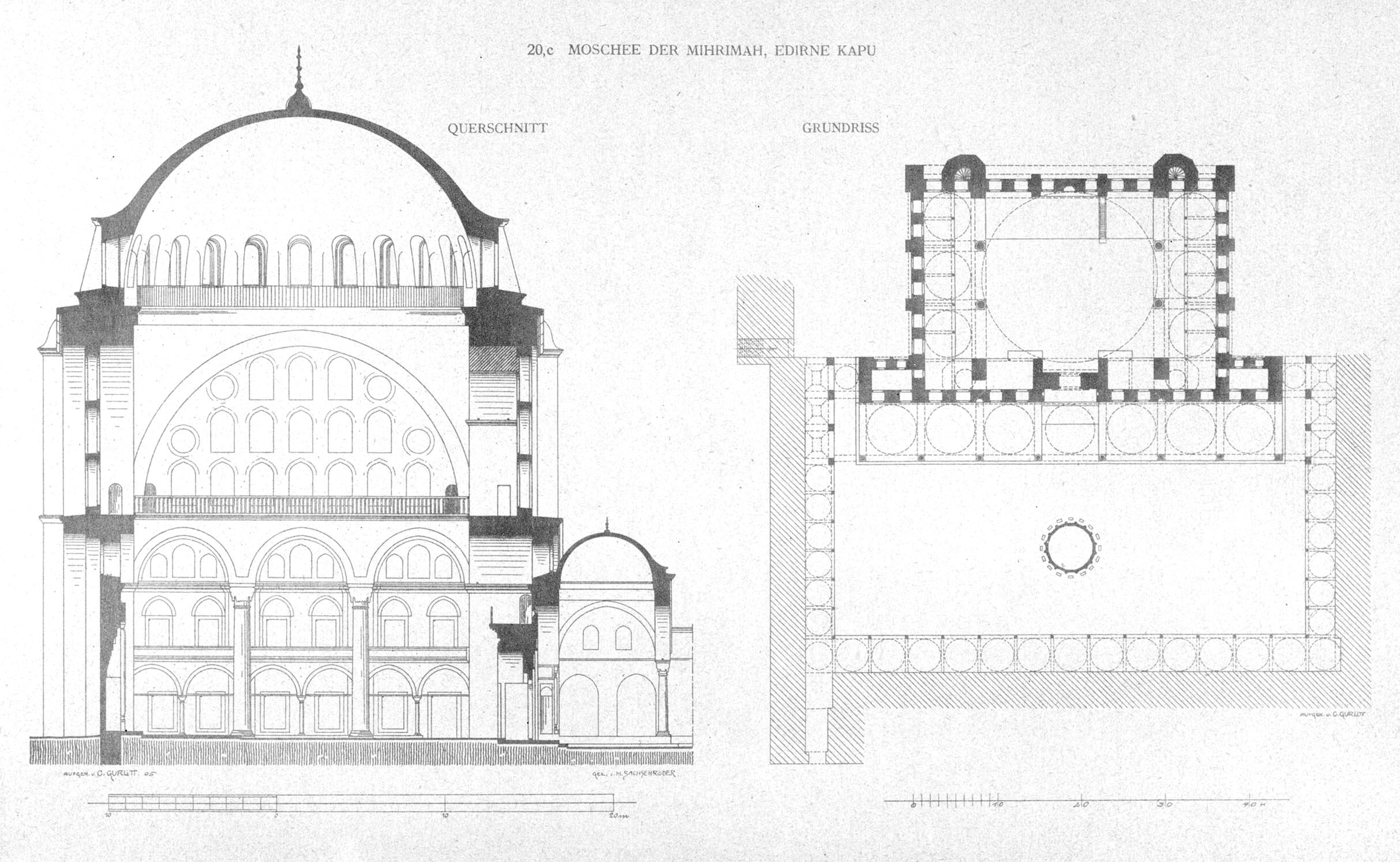
Cross section and plan by Cornelius Gurlitt, 1912

The Mihrimah Sultan Mosque (Turkish: Mihrimah Sultan Cami) is a 16th-century Ottoman mosque located near the Byzantine land walls in the Edirnekapı neighborhood of Istanbul, Turkey. It was commissioned by Mihrimah Sultan, the daughter of Suleiman the Magnificent and Hürrem Sultan, and designed by the chief imperial architect Mimar Sinan. Sited on the summit of the Sixth Hill near the highest point of the city, the mosque is a prominent city landmark.

== History ==
The Mihrimah Sultan Mosque in Edirnekapı is the second and larger of two mosques named and commissioned by Mihrimah Sultan, the much loved only daughter of Suleiman the Magnificent. It was designed by Mimar Sinan and, although there is no foundation inscription, the evidence from surviving manuscripts suggests that building work started in 1563 and was completed by 1570.

On several occasions the mosque has been damaged by earthquakes. In 1719 some of the stairs in the minaret were destroyed; in 1766, an earthquake caused the collapse of the minaret and the main dome of the mosque; in the severe 1894 earthquake the minaret came crashing down on the north west corner of the mosque. (Note: The German art historian Cornelius Gurlitt includes a photograph showing the damaged mosque and the collapsed minaret in his 1912 book Die Baukunst Konstantinopels.) Although efforts were made to restore the mosque itself, its attendant buildings received less attention. The mosque was restored in 1956-57 but the dome was damaged again during the 1999 İzmit earthquake.

In the first phase of the most recent restoration undertaken between 2007 and 2010 the mosque and the upper part of the minaret were repaired. The second phase involved paving the courtyard, restoring the central fountain and rebuilding an outer portico (the mosque originally had a double portico but only the inner part had survived).

== Architecture ==
=== Exterior ===
The mosque was built on a terrace overlooking the main street. A portico divided into individual cells forming a medrese (Islamic school) surrounds the mosque's large courtyard. In the center of the courtyard is a large ablutions fountain (sadirvan). Entry to the mosque is through an imposing porch of seven domed bays with marble and granite columns. The mosque itself is a cube topped by a half-sphere, with symmetrical multi-windowed tympana on each of the four sides. The dome is supported by four towers, one in each corner; its base is pierced by windows. The single minaret is tall and slender; during the 1894 earthquake it crashed through the roof of the mosque. It has since been fully restored.

=== Interior ===
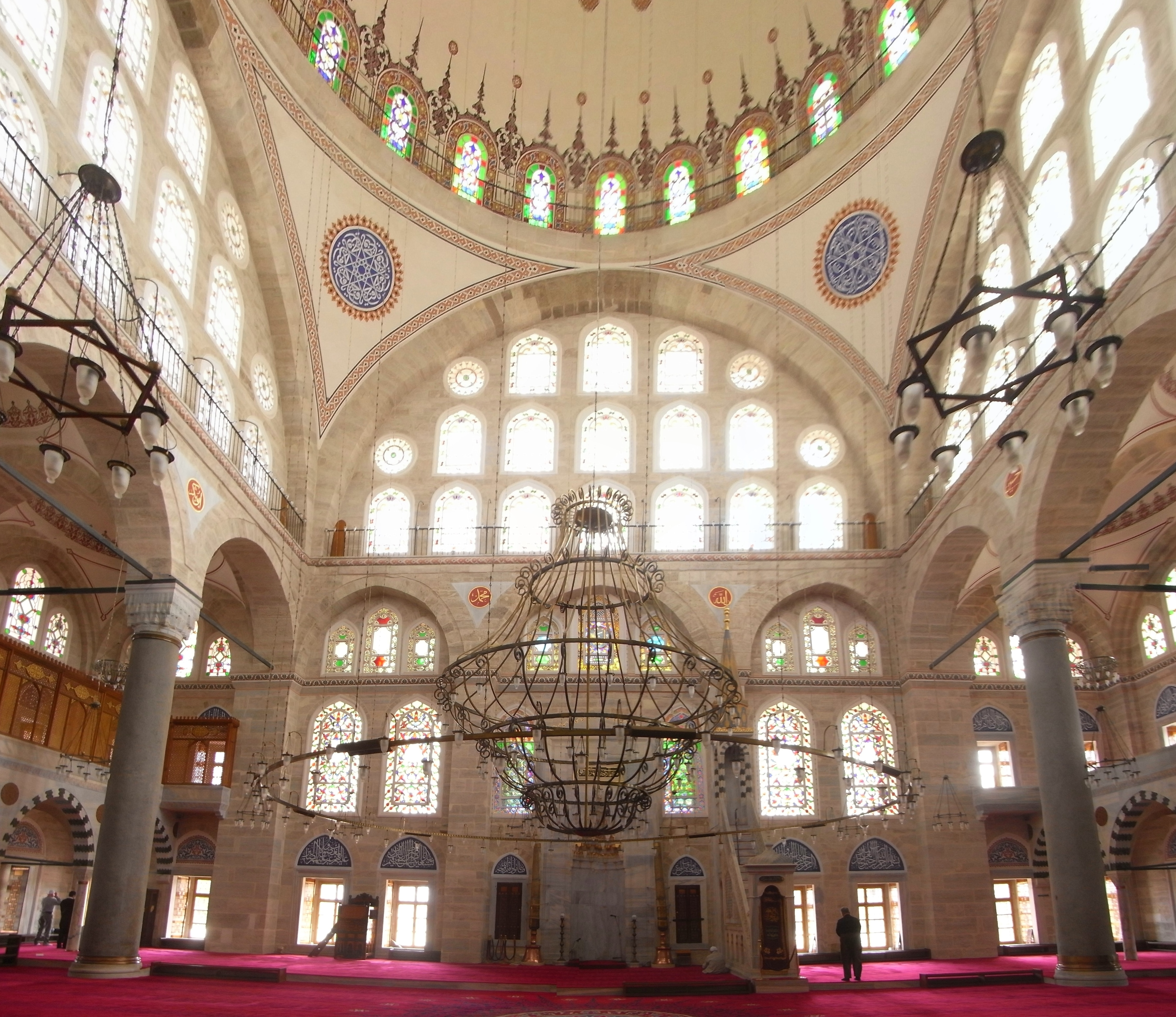
Interior of Mihrimah Sultan Mosque (Edirnekapı)

The dome is 20 metres (66 feet) in diameter and 37 metres (121 feet) high. On the north and south sides, triple arcades supported by granite columns open onto side aisles with galleries above, each with three domed bays. Much of the surface area of the walls is made up of windows, making the mosque one of the lightest interiors of any of Sinan's works. Some of the windows contain stained glass.

The interior stencil decorations are all modern. However, the minbar in carved white marble is from the original construction.

=== Complex ===
As first built, the Mihrimah Sultan Mosque was the centre of a complex (külliye) which included a medrese, a double hamam, a tomb (türbe) and a row of shops (arasta) beneath the terrace, whose rents provided financial support for the complex. The hamam is still in use today.

Mihrimah Sultana herself is buried at the Süleymaniye Mosque, but a ruined türbe behind this mosque houses the graves of her son-in-law, the Grand Vizier Semiz Ali Pasha, her daughter Ayşe Hümaşah Sultan, her grandsons Mehmed Bey, Şehid Mustafa Pasha and Osman Bey and many other members of her family.

== Gallery ==
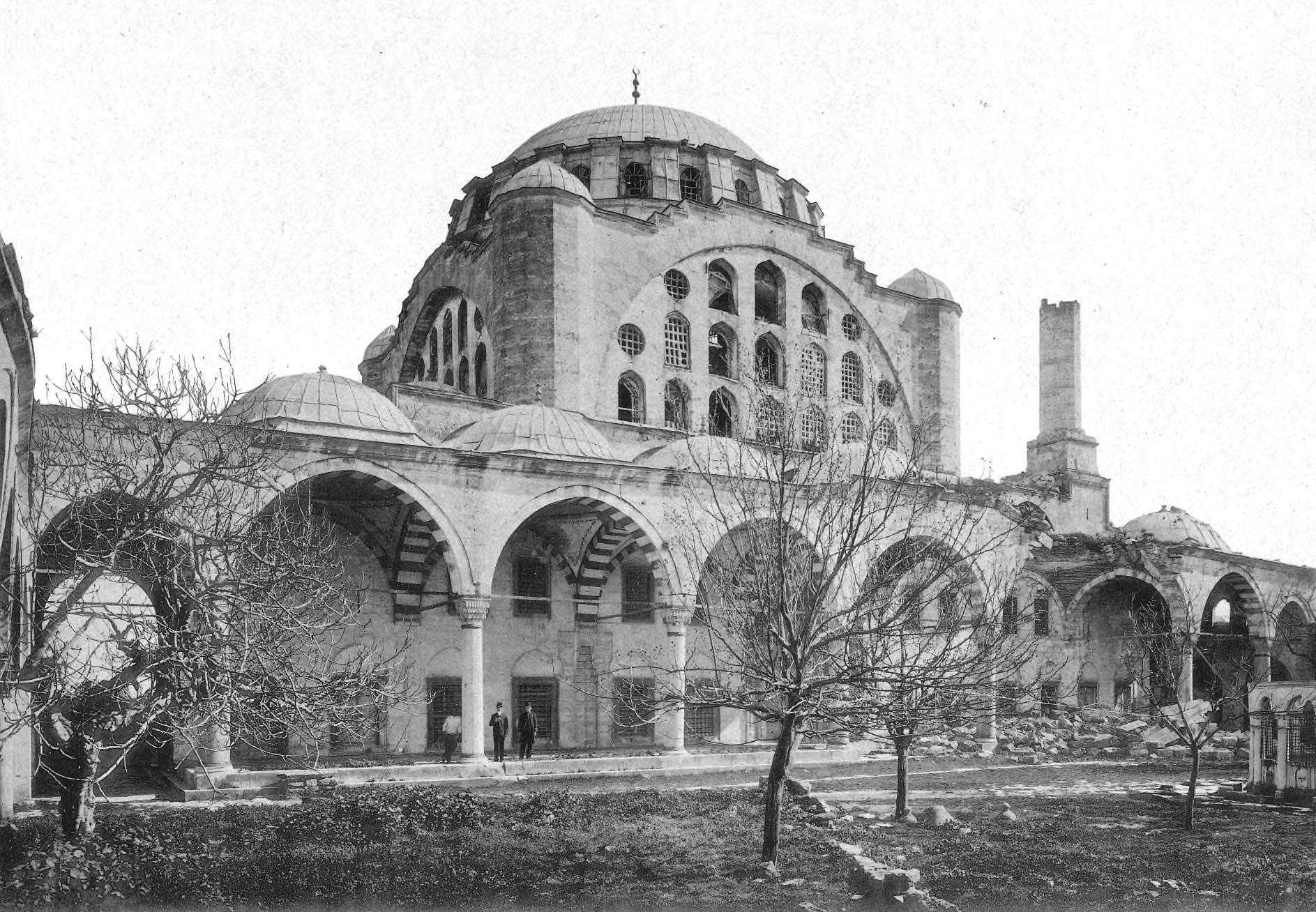
Damage after the 1894 earthquake, Gurlitt 1912

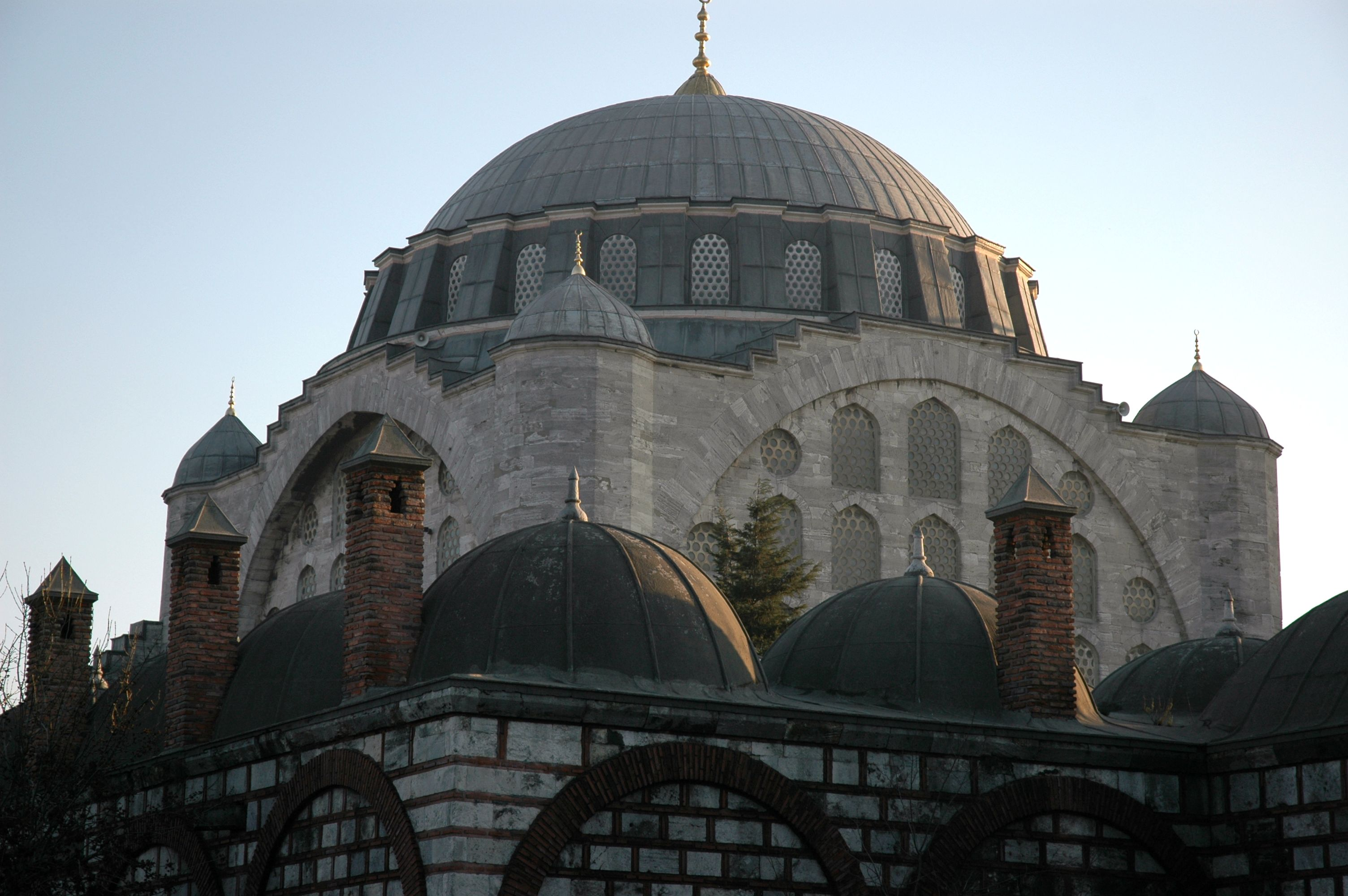
Dome of Mihrimah Sultan Cami

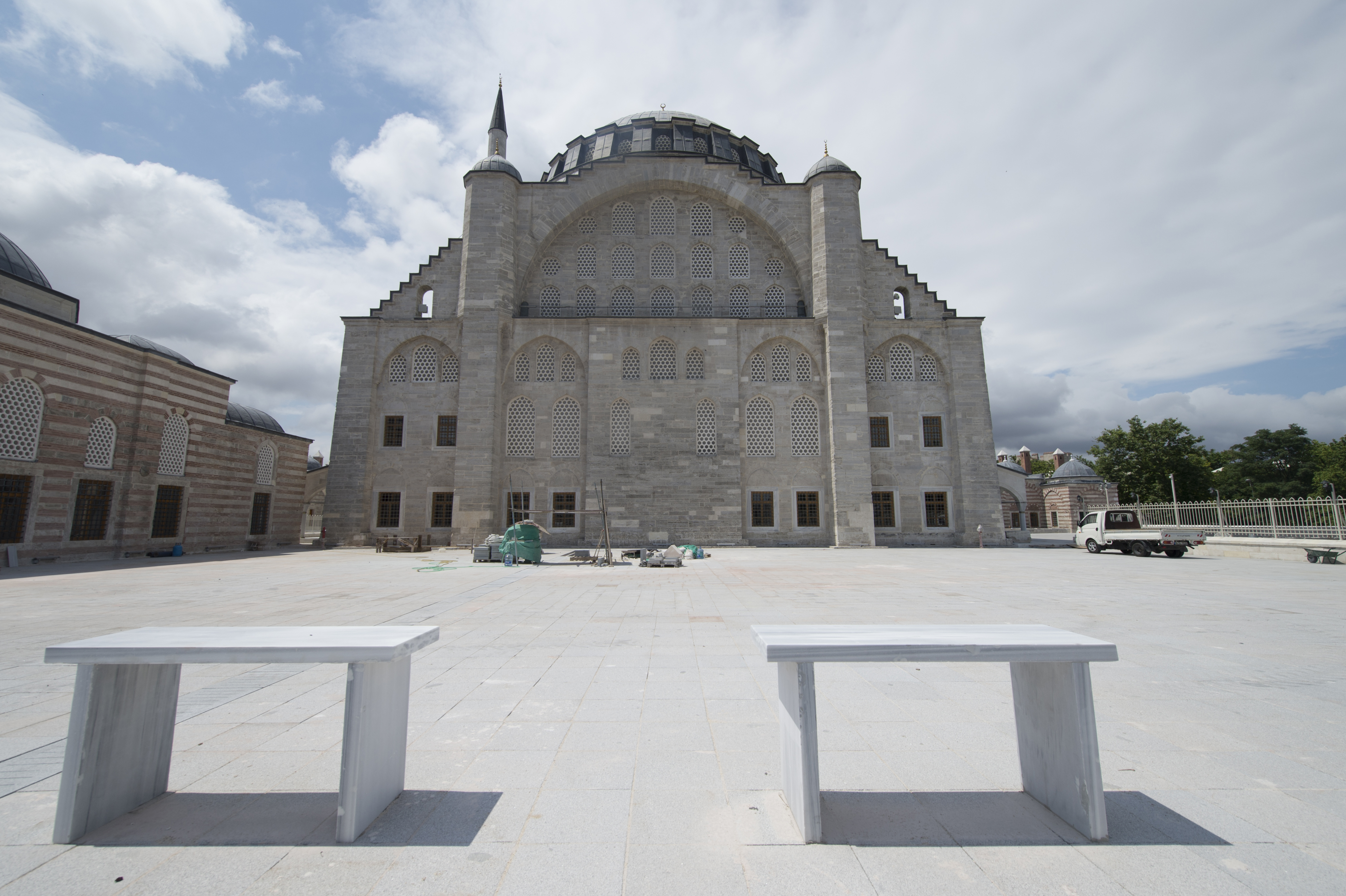
Mihrimah Sultan Mosque from east side

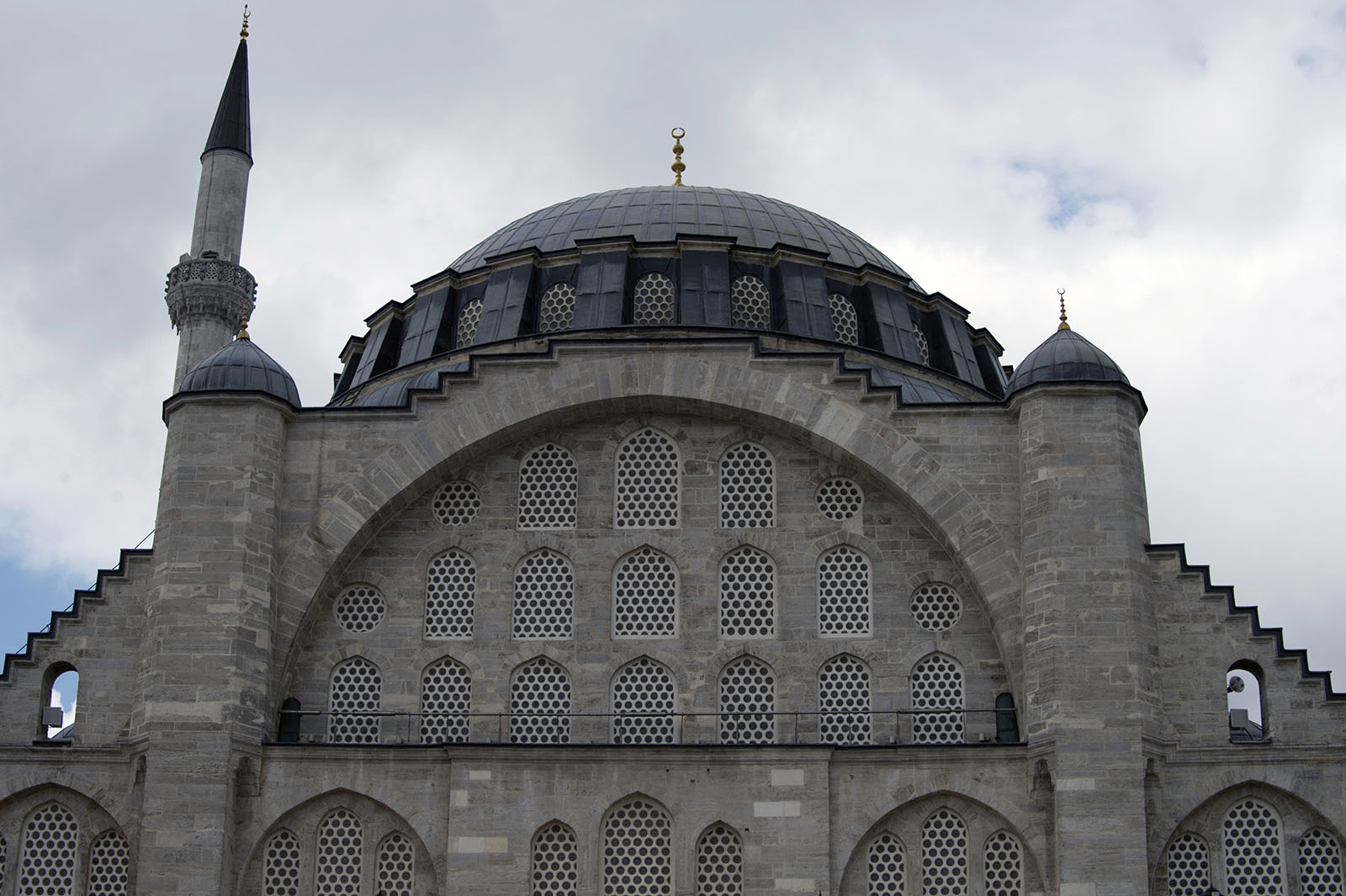
Mihrimah Sultan Mosque dome

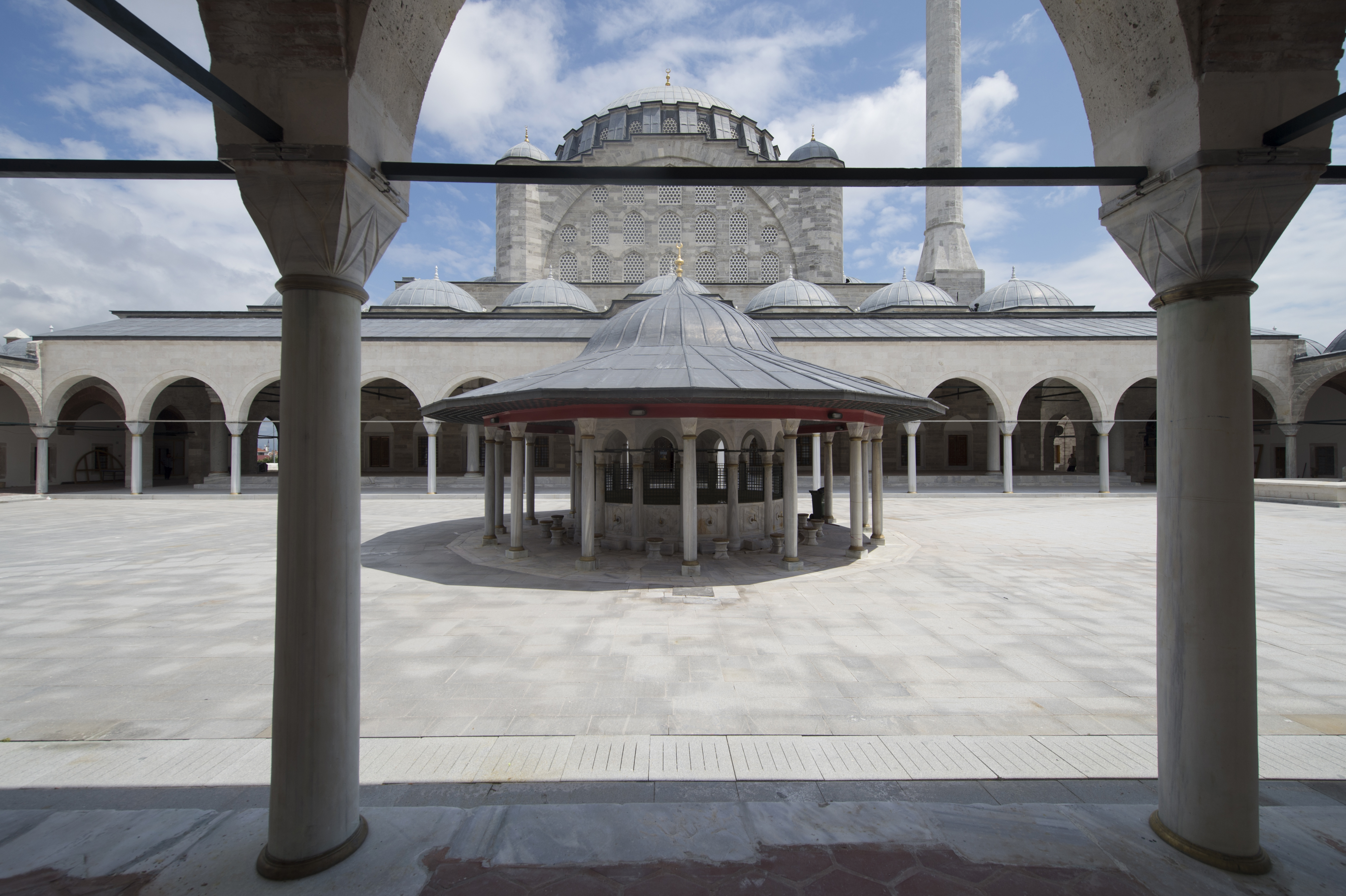
Mihrimah Sultan Mosque courtyard

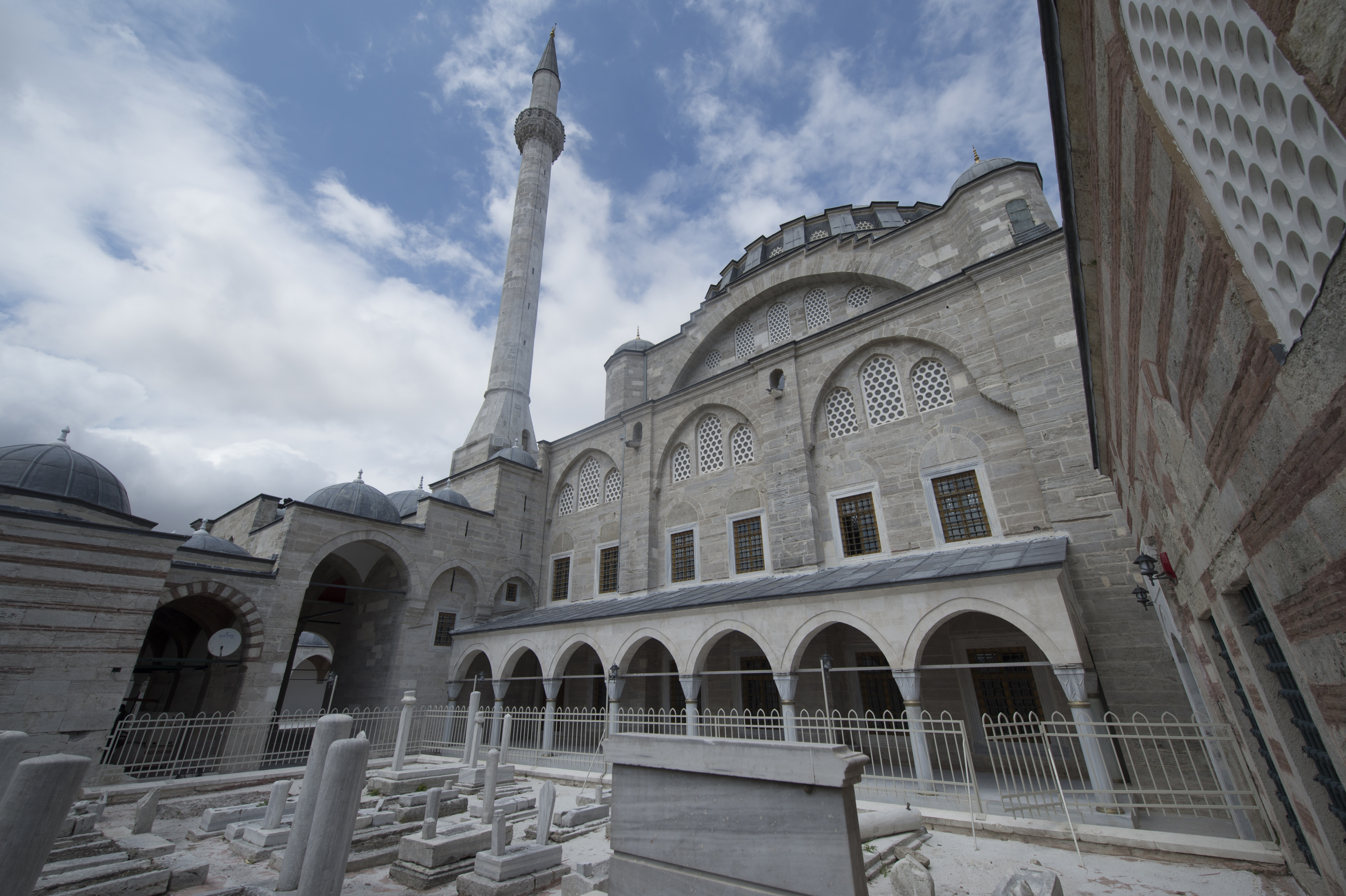
South side of Mihrimah Sultan Mosque with graveyard

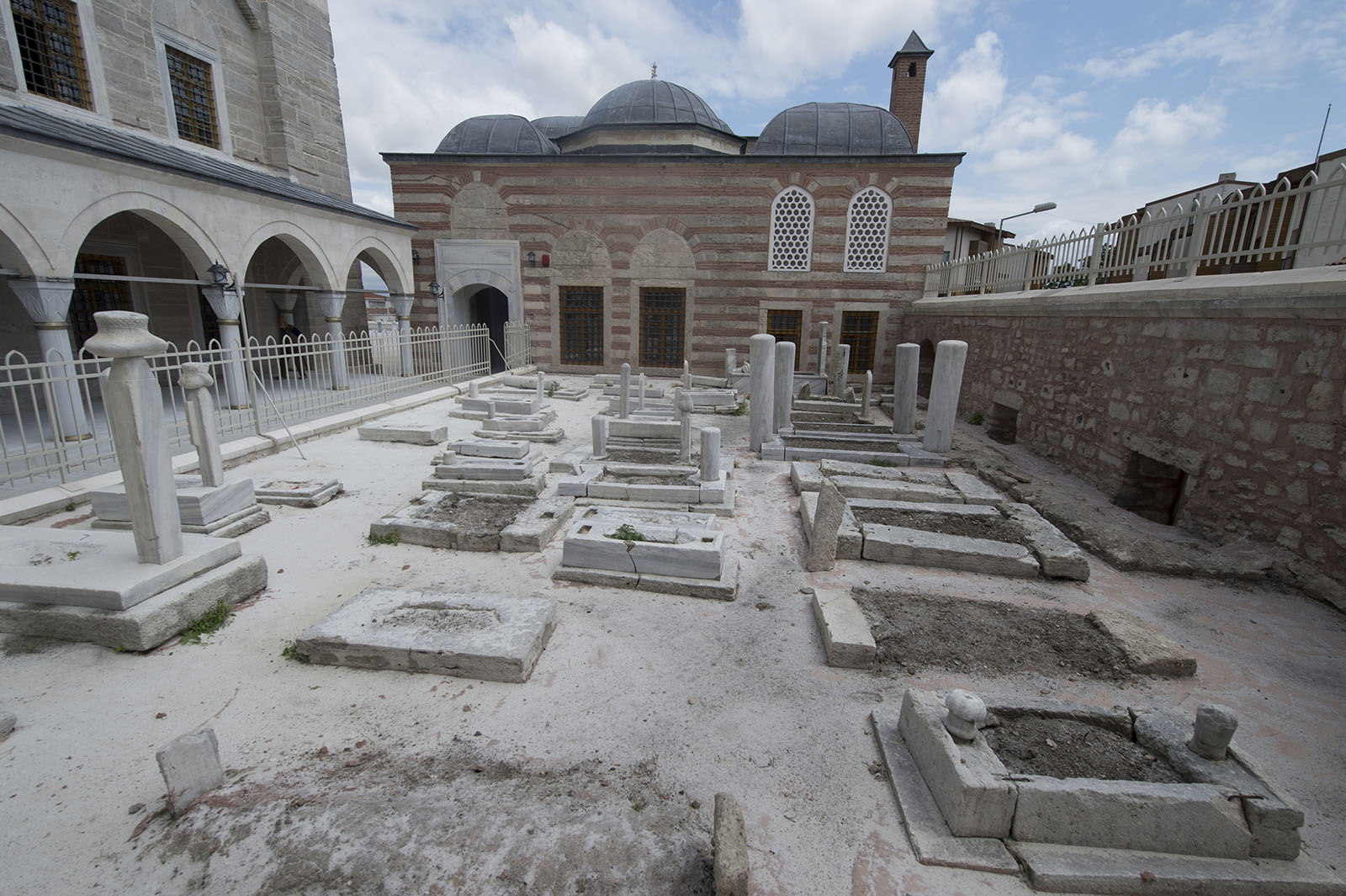
Mihrimah Sultan Mosque graveyard

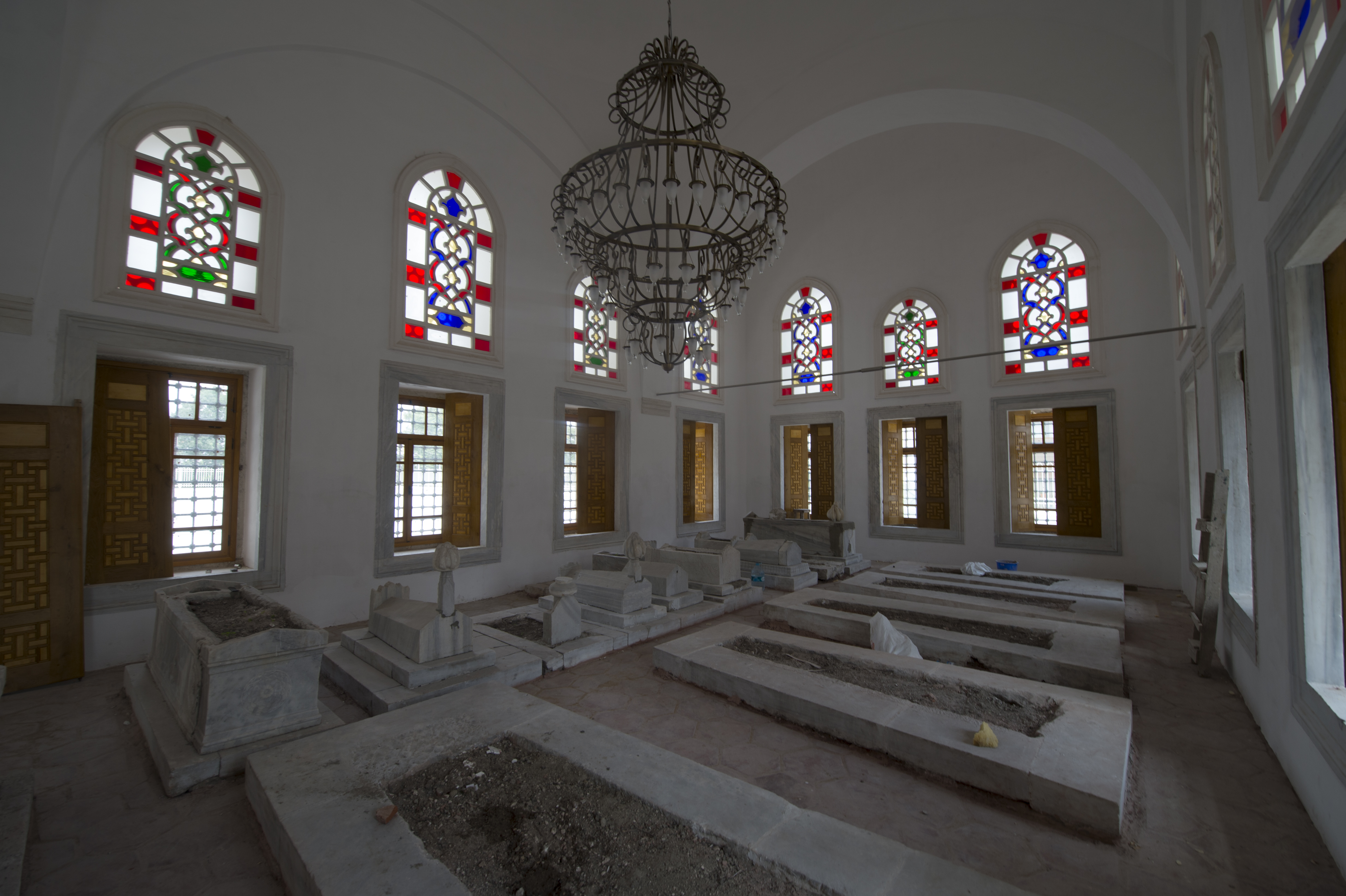
Mihrimah Sultan Mosque: interior of mausoleum

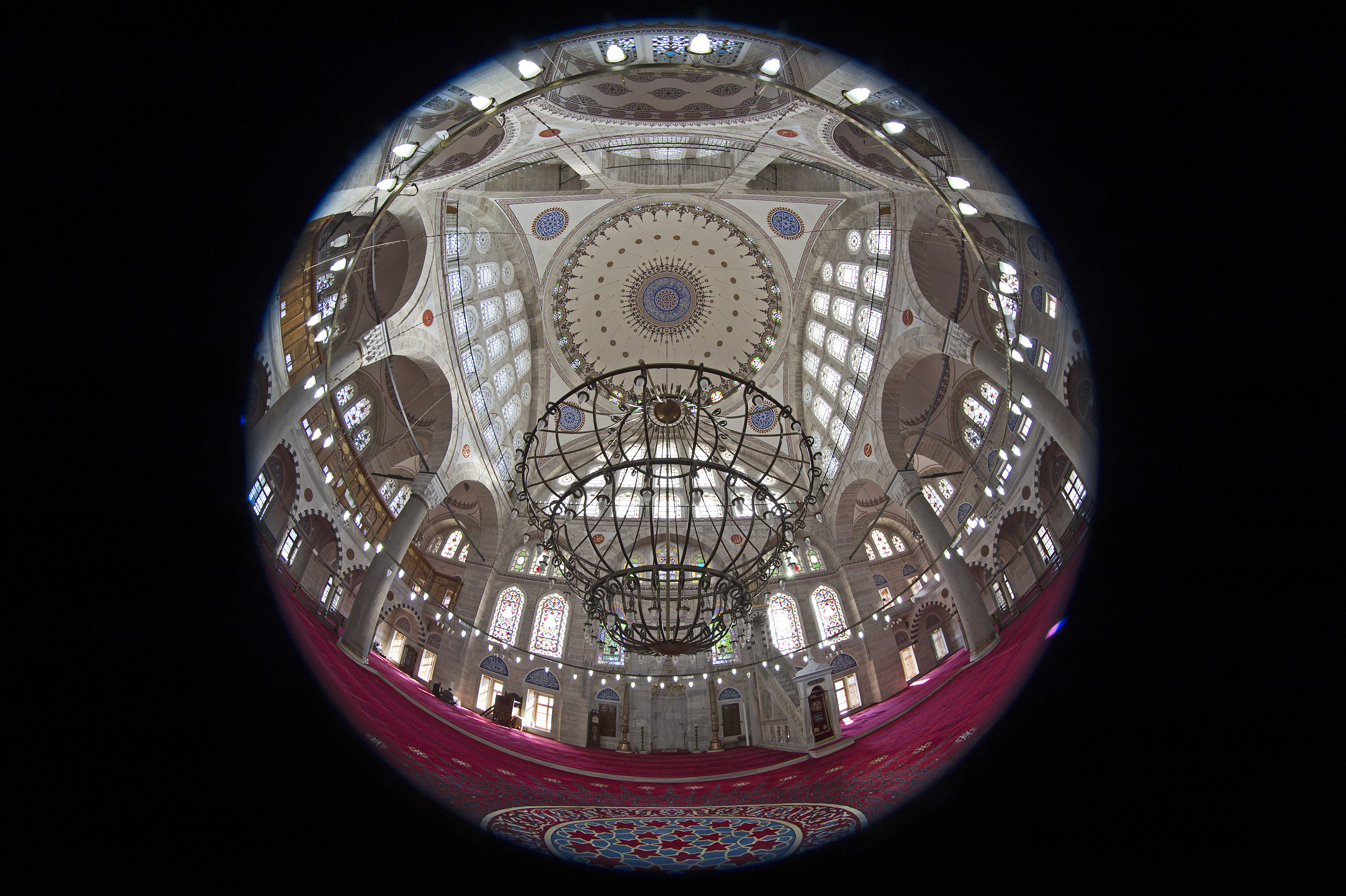
Mihrimah Sultan Mosque interior

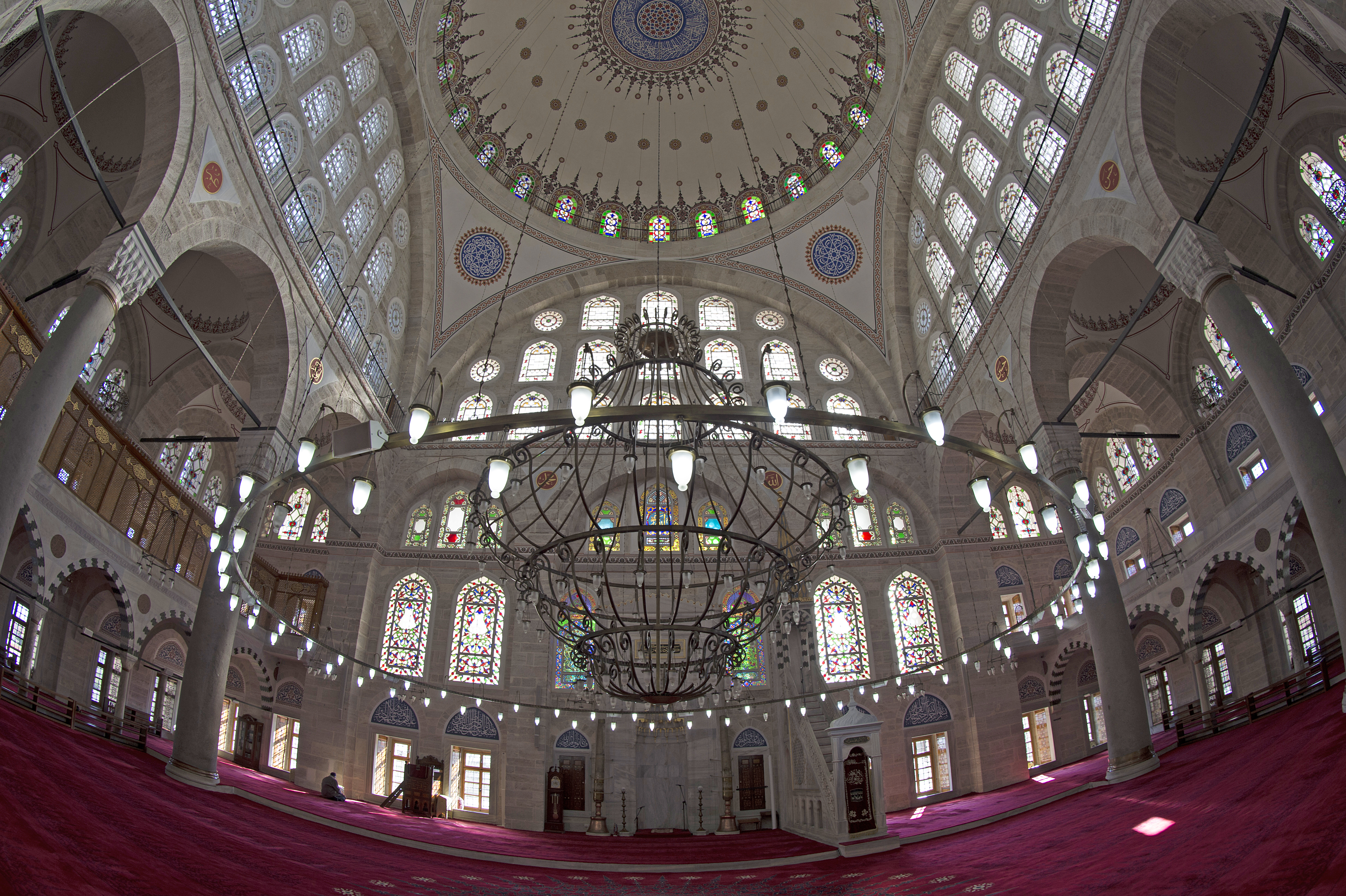
Mihrimah Sultan Mosque interior

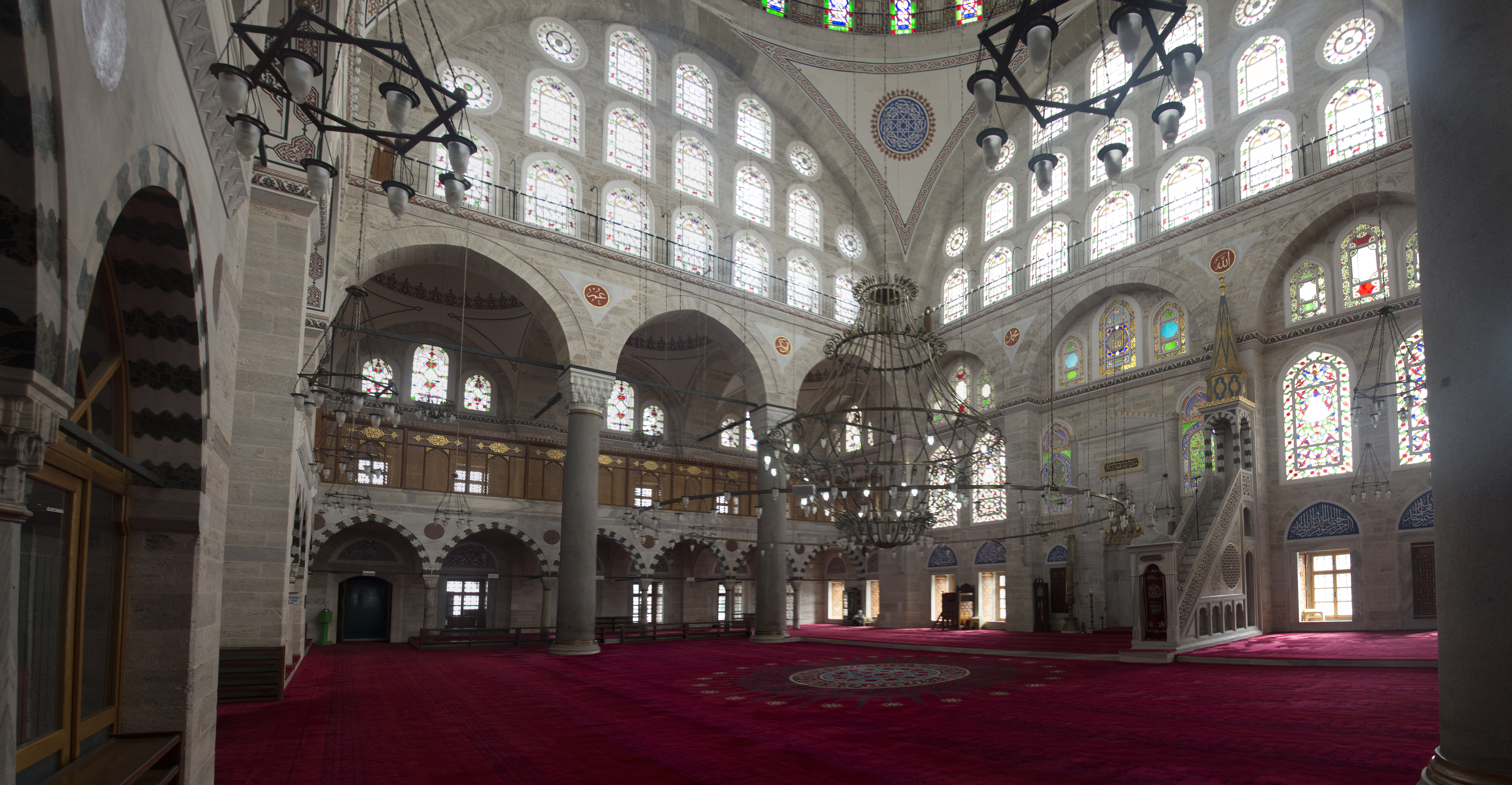
Interior of Mihrimah Sultan Mosque

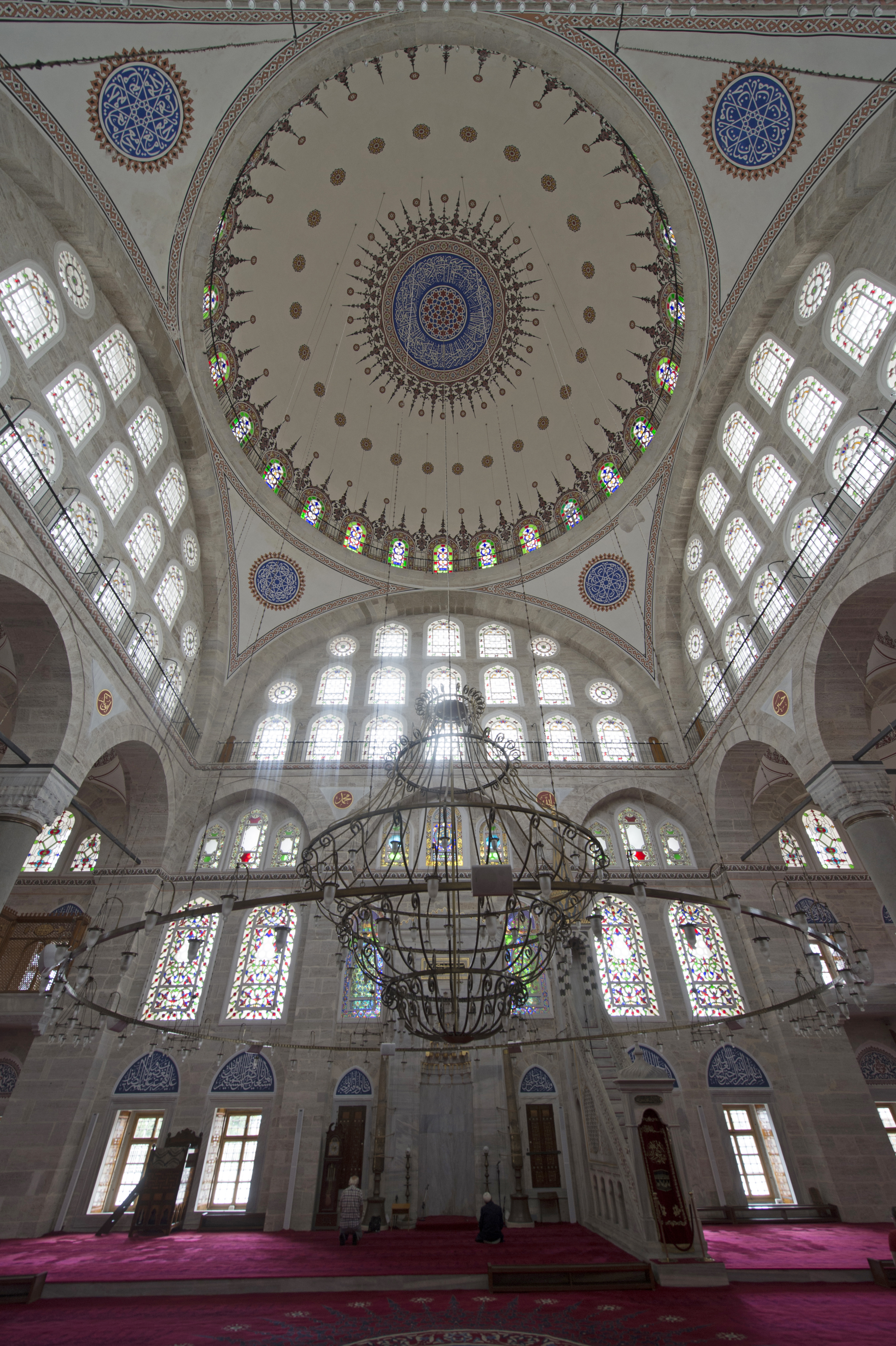
Mihrimah Sultan Mosque prayer area and dome

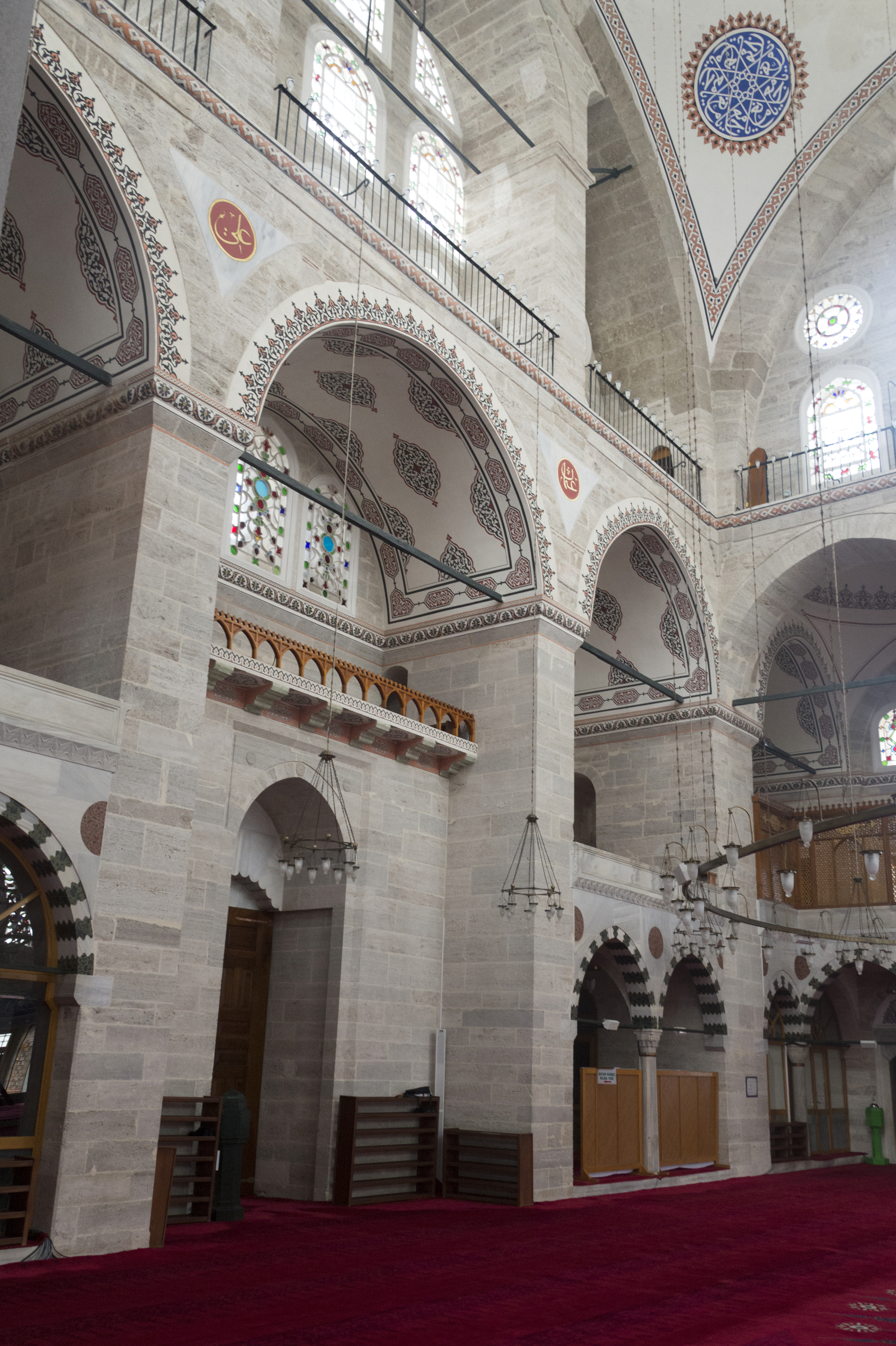
Mihrimah Sultan Mosque: entrance from courtyard

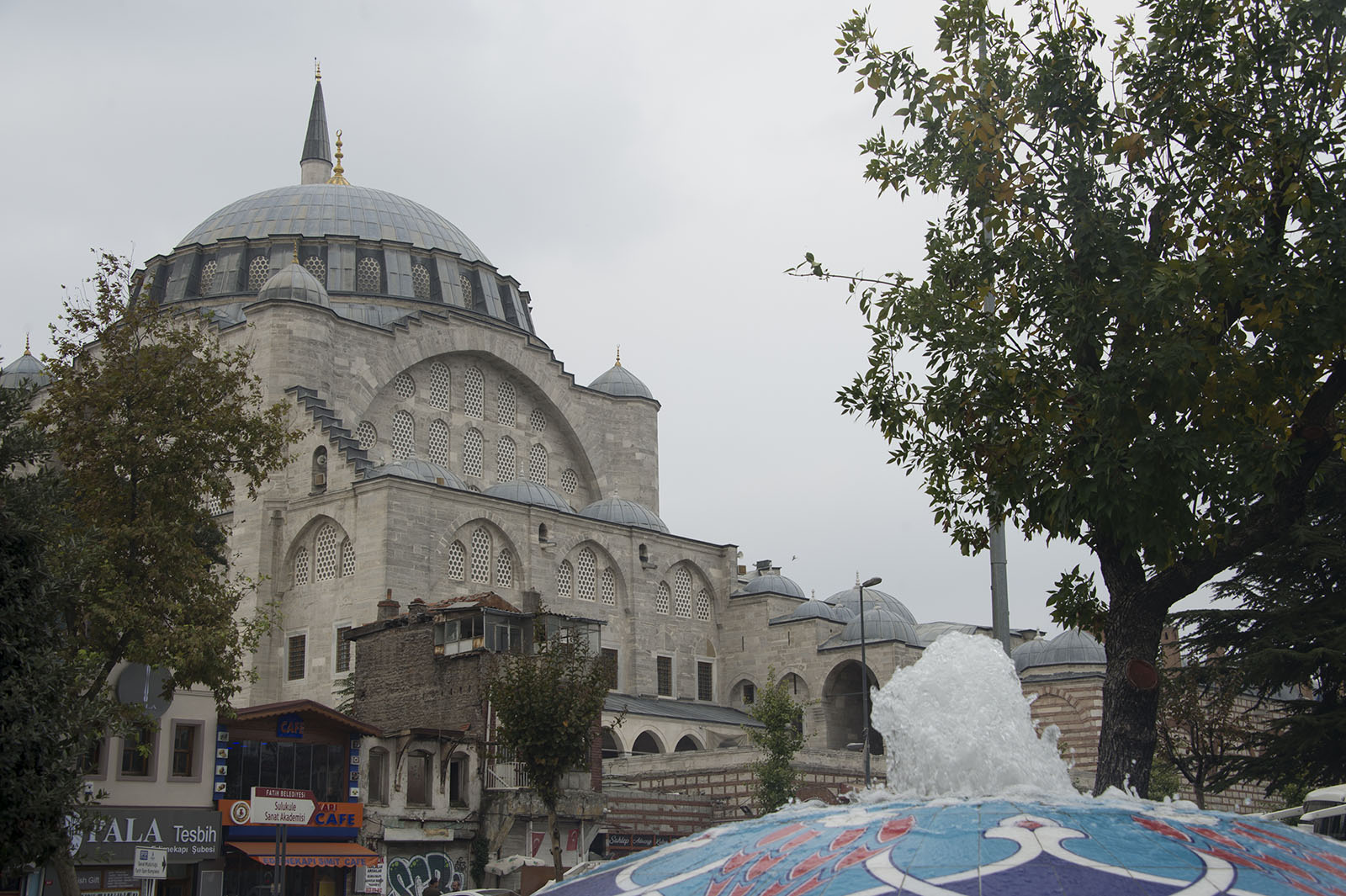
Mihrimah Sultan Mosque view from nearby square

== See also ==
- Mihrimah Sultan Mosque, Üsküdar
- List of Friday mosques designed by Mimar Sinan

== Sources ==
- Goodwin, Godfrey (2003) [1971]. A History of Ottoman Architecture. London: Thames & Hudson. ISBN 978-0-500-27429-3.
- Gurlitt, Cornelius (1912). Die Baukunst Konstantinopels. Vol. 2. Berlin: E. Wasmuth.
- Kuşseven, Gamze (2014). "Edirnekapı Mihrimah Sultan Külliyesi'ne Bağlı Yapıların Son Restorasyonlarına Ait Uygulamalar" [The latest restoration works of buildings of the Minrimah Sultan Complex in Edirnekapı]. Restorasyon Yıllığı Dergisi (in Turkish). 9: 80–88. hdl:11352/2133.
- Müller-Wiener, Wolfgang (1977). Bildlexikon Zur Topographie Istanbuls: Byzantion, Konstantinupolis, Istanbul Bis Zum Beginn D. 17 Jh (in German). Tübingen: Wasmuth. ISBN 978-3-8030-1022-3.
- Necipoğlu, Gülru (2005). The Age of Sinan: Architectural Culture in the Ottoman Empire. London: Reaktion Books. ISBN 978-1-86189-253-9.
- Sav, Murat; Kuşüzümü, Kıvanç H. (2010). "Restorasyon Çalışmaları Çerçevesinde Mihrimah Sultan Camii". Restorasyon Yıllığı Dergisi (in Turkish). 1: 46–55. hdl:11352/237.
- Sav, Murat; Kuşüzümü, Kıvanç H. (2014). "Mihrimah Sultan Camii'ndeki Son Restorasyon Çalışmalarının Değerlendirmesi" [Remarks on the latest restoration works of the Mihrimah Sultan Mosque]. Restorasyon Yıllığı Dergisi (in Turkish). 9: 52–63. hdl:11352/2130.
