= Edirnekapı, Fatih =

Quarter in Istanbul, Turkey

Coordinates: 41°01′52″N 28°56′21″E

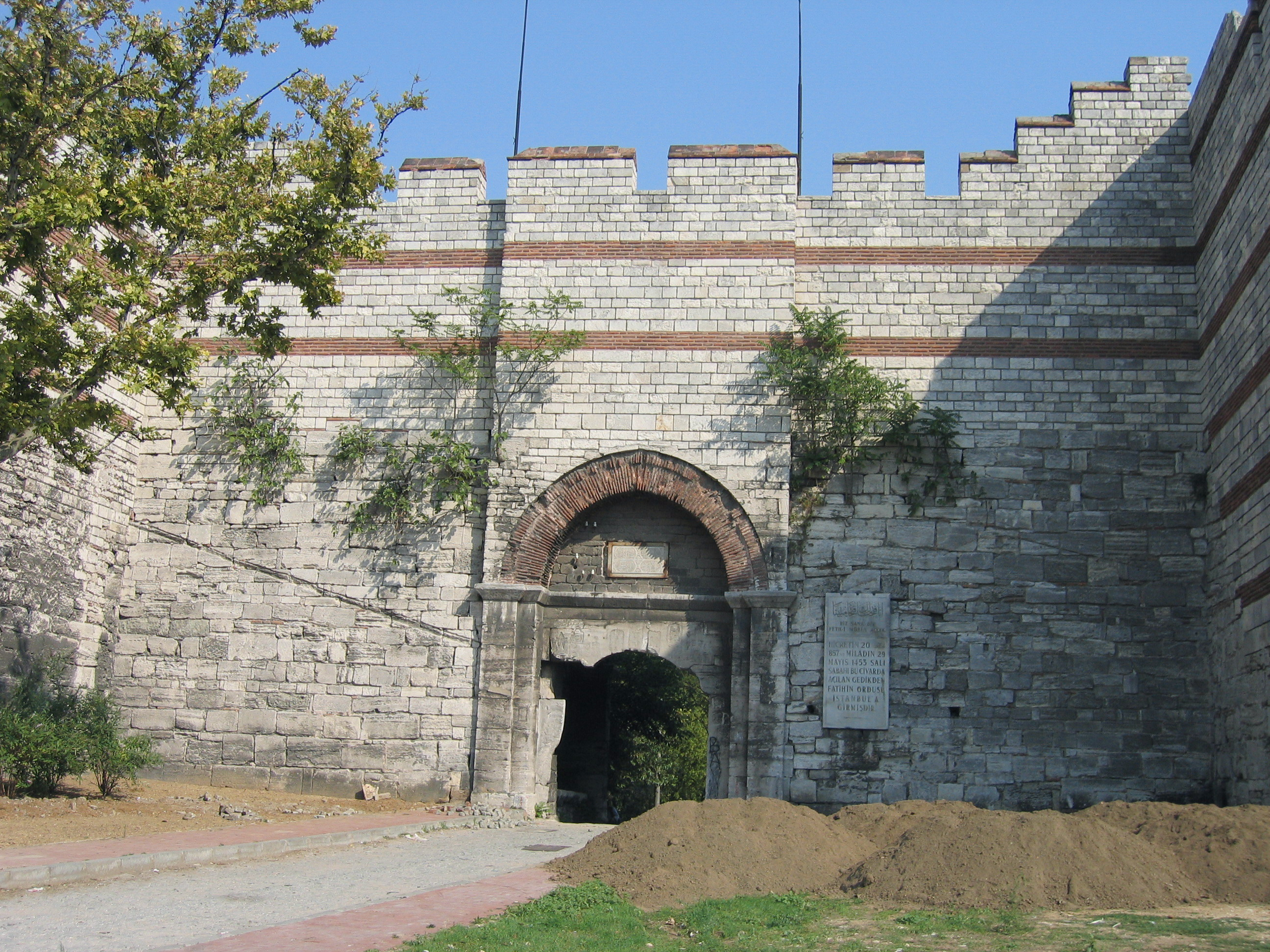
The restored Gate of Charisius or Adrianople Gate (Edirnekapı in Turkish), where Sultan Mehmed II entered the city.

Edirnekapı (lit. 'Adrianople Gate') is a quarter of Istanbul, Turkey. It is part of the district of Fatih and belongs to the walled city.

It corresponds roughly to the central part of the sixth Hill of Istanbul, which is the highest point of the walled city. It lies south of the Blachernae section of the Walls and of the neighborhood of Ayvansaray, northwest of Karagümrük and west of Salmatomruk. The quarter corresponds to the Byzantine quarter of Deuteron. The name Edirnekapı ("Gate of Edirne") hearkens back to Edirne's Gate (the ancient Gate of Charisius), crossed by the old road, which led to Edirne, the ancient Adrianople in Thracia. The district had a significant percentage of Orthodox Christian population, which left it for more central areas after 1955.

The quarter is crossed by Fevzi Paşa Caddesi, one of the most important roads of the historic part of Istanbul.

== Places of interest ==
Edirnekapı has several historical sites, like the Mosque of Kariye, the historic Hagia Yorgi Greek Orthodox Church, and the imperial Mosque of Mihrimah Sultan. Outside the gate lies the Edirnekapı Martyr's Cemetery, one of the oldest cemeteries of Istanbul. The famous legist Ibrahim al-Halabi is buried here.

=== Hagia Yorgi Church ===
The Greek Orthodox church Hagia Yorgi is in Edirnekapı. The church was demolished during the time of the Byzantine Empire, at the order of Constantine V, and then rebuilt before being demolished to make way for Mihrimah Sultan mosque under the Ottoman Empire in 1556. The church was moved to its present-day location and rebuilt, to be restored twice in the 18th century. However, the church collapsed entirely during the next century, to be rebuilt and restored yet again. In 2014, a nearly 4 million-lira restoration project was launched, and completed in 2017.
